= Ciompi Revolt =

1378–82 labourer revolt in Florence, Italy

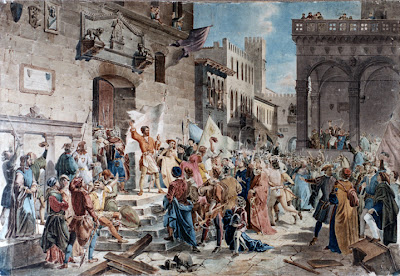
Il tumulto dei ciompi by Giuseppe Lorenzo Gatteri (1829–1844)

The Ciompi Revolt ([ˈt͡ʃom.pi], CHOM-pee; Italian: Tumulto dei Ciompi) was a rebellion among unrepresented labourers which occurred in the Republic of Florence in Tuscany, Italy, from 1378 to 1382. Those who revolted consisted of artisans, labourers, and craftsmen who did not belong to any guilds and were therefore unable to participate in the Florentine government. These labourers had grown increasingly resentful over the established patrician oligarchy. In addition, they were expected to pay heavy taxes which they could not afford, forcing some to abandon their homes. The resulting insurrection over such tensions led to the creation of a government composed of wool workers and other disenfranchised workers which lasted for three and a half years.

The Ciompi Revolt developed in three stages: reform in May and June, the violent "revolution" of the revolt and fighting in mid-July, and the fall of the Ciompi government – the "reaction", at the end of August 1378. These workers' underrepresentation led to their exploitation, low wages, and political impotence. In June 1378 the city's fourteen minor guilds demanded greater representation in civic office from elites – the Signoria. These guildsmen still wanted to keep the Sotto posti, who were low wage textile workers with no guild representation, from forming their own guilds and being able to gain increased political power. To prevent this, the Signoria quadrupled the fee for admittance to the system. This action sparked indignation and turned the Sotto posti into opponents of the Signoria, aligning them with the lower class Ciompi. On 22 June the Ciompi took up arms for the first time but it was not until 21 July that they violently took over the city's government and forced the Signoria to create three new guilds and grant them political office.

Historians commonly highlight a few individuals as central to the events. Representing the middle and upper class was Salvestro de' Medici. Representing the lower class was the mysterious group known as "The Eight (Saints)". Finally caught in the middle of these two groups is Michele di Lando. He was "separated from his social superior due to inferior birth, but he was also separated from his peers by his superior vision".

Although the Ciompi Revolt was brief, it left an impact on future generations. The three-and-a-half-year revolt not only affected Florentine society throughout the 15th century, but was a flashpoint in Florentine history, which continued to intrigue historians. Interpretations of the events evolved across the centuries.

== Background ==
=== Unstable government ===
In the years preceding the 1378 revolt, certain aspects of Florentine society set the stage for the uprising. Tensions within the oligarchy were already present decades before the revolt occurred. The Arti Minori, or minor guilds, were constantly in contention with the Arti Maggiori, or the seven major guilds. Between the years of 1339 to 1349, wealthy houses went bankrupt and markets were reduced. The economy never peaked nor declined sharply again, aside from minor political and military disputes familiar to Florence. Economic grievances had drawn artisans and wage-labourers into Florentine politics from the mid-fourteenth century. These workers, however, were forbidden from associating by city government. The oligarchy was unstable, as many either died from the plague or fled to safer territories. From these turbulent times emerged the gente nuova ('new men') a class of mainly immigrants with no aristocratic background who grew their wealth from trade. Together, the gente nuova and Arti Minori bonded over their dislike of the oligarchy. Each side sought to gain control over the other, as the oligarchy used the Guelph Party to justify their patriciate status, while the gente nuova appealed to the middle and lower classes for support. In 1375 the gente nuova seriously challenged the privileges of the oligarchy, sparking concerns from the latter of their possible collapse. In addition, war broke out against the papacy in the same year, increasing the costly burdens on the city. In late 1377 to early 1378, the oligarchy and the gente nuova formed a truce, only to be broken by the oligarchy in June, the month of the revolt.

=== Upper class versus lower class and the origins of the term ciompi ===
Tensions between the upper and lower classes were a major factor in bringing about the revolt. It is unclear who exactly qualified as belonging to the Florentine upper class, unlike in Venice, where the class hierarchy was solidly entrenched. For the most part of the 14th century, a patriciate could be identified by the presence of a family name. On the other side of the spectrum were the popolo minuto, or the labouring classes of Florence, which also had no set boundaries. For example, an artisan could be considered elite if he was wealthy and successful. The majority of the popolo minuto, however, consisted of poor labourers flocking from villages to the city for work. Forced loans, high taxes and an even higher incidence of indebtedness kept the ciompi impoverished. In 1355, the miserabiles, defined as having no property, whose possessions were worth less than 100 lire and had no trade or profession, accounted for 22% of households in Florence. The most important aspect of this class is that they had no representation in the Florentine government, which would be one of the main changes implemented by the ciompi later on. These artisans and labourers were not part of guilds until the ciompi and the Arti Minori took over the government beginning in 1378. In becoming the ciompi, the word derives from the florentine word for ‘cardare la lana’ or ‘ciompare’ as the wool workers were the most representative and numerous group of people involved in the revolt although it included also other groups. Records of condemned ciompi rebels show, in fact, that tavern owners were also found to be part of the revolt.

=== Rising taxes ===
In Florence in 1371, unequal taxation was the norm; in particular, the highlanders paid three times more in taxes than plain dwellers. This increase in taxation was not due to Florence's wars with Pisa from 1362–1364, or to the revolt of San Miniato from 1369–1370, but from the need to pay for increased military forces to push back against the Ubaldini and their allies. The Ubaldini were a feudal family who had strong influences over the peasants living in the Alpi Fiorentine, and Florence wished to break these ties for control in the north. Adding to the need for more military forces was the increased crime and attacks directed at merchants and at pilgrims passing through Florence that developed after the Black Death. To pay these militias, however, Florence was getting deeper in debt, and the oligarchy burdened those living in the countryside with increasing taxation. As taxes kept on increasing, the highlanders chose to flee, worsening a labour shortage, already present after the Black Death. Furthermore, there were increasing differences in wealth between the popolo minuto and the patriciates. In fact, before the ciompi, there were already rebellions organized by labourers, such as the 9 October 1343 revolt by wool workers led by the Sienese Aldobrando di Ciecharino, who lived in Florence.

== Revolt ==
The Revolt of the Ciompi was a popular revolt in Florence in 1378 spearheaded by wool carders known as Ciompi (Italian pronunciation: [ˈtʃompi]) and other non-guilded workers who rose up to demand a voice in the commune's ordering in addition to enacting debt and tax reforms. The revolt was an outburst of proletarian unrest in the city of Florence that began in June 1378 and consisted of three phases ending in August of the same year. It was the result of a power struggle between Florence's ruling elites, the established artisan guilds of Florence, and Sotto posti (or un-guilded) which included the Ciompi; mainly a group of low-wage textile workers employed in Florence's thriving wool industry. At its height, this trade sold fabrics throughout Italy as well as overseas and employed up to a third of Florence's population. Many of the issues leading to the revolt of the Ciompi involved the politics and relations between guild and non-guild members, as well as the ruling elites of the city (the Signoria). Guild members and the guild system were important aspects of Florence's politics by 1378, where they acted as political intermediaries between the individuals in their guild and the state. Guilds enforced industrial, fiscal, and monetary policy which benefited their trades and the lives of their workers in addition to representing them politically, regulating their industries, and controlling who could become a member. As mentioned previously the guild system involved a hierarchy between the seven major and fourteen minor guild associations; the former represented those who had become a class of prosperous cloth merchants and bankers/financiers, and the latter consisting of various artisans, craftsmen and skilled labourers including, but not limited to, shoemakers, tailors and wine merchants.

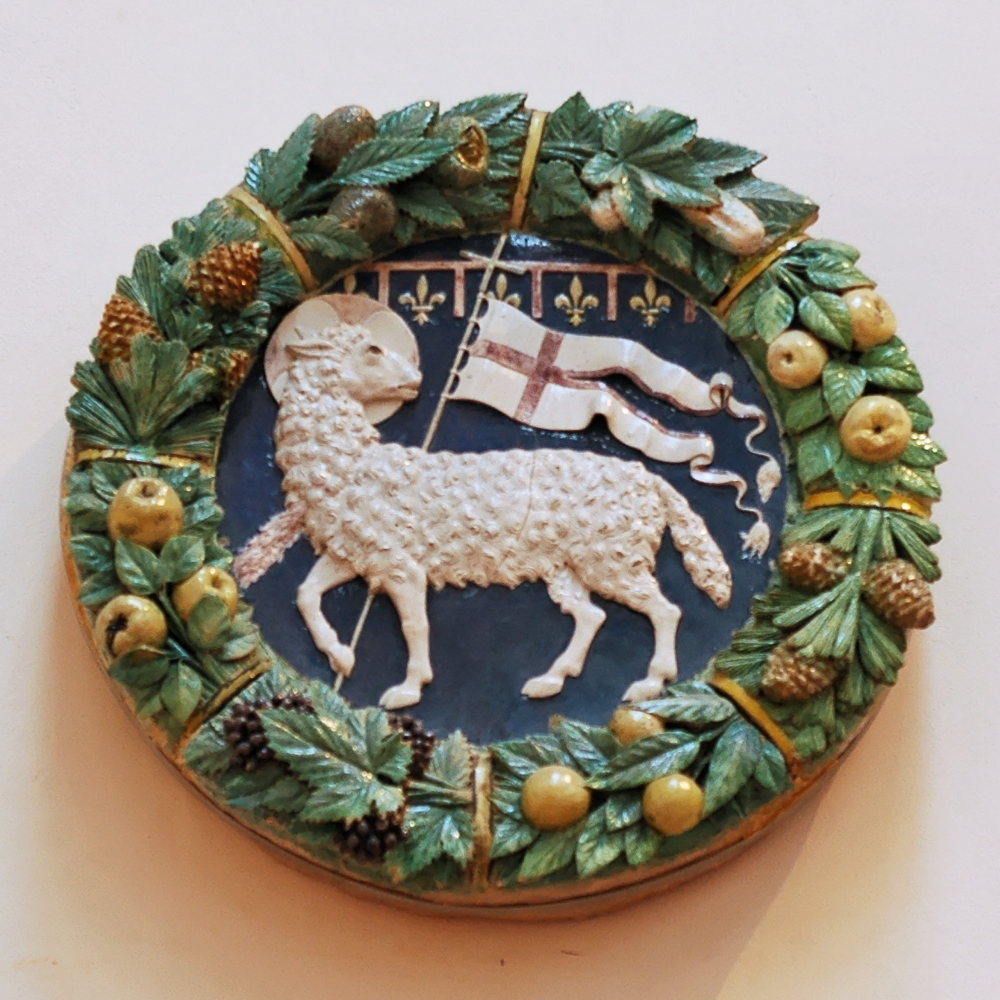
Coat of arms of the Arte della Lana, Andrea della Robbia, 1487, Museo dell'Opera del Duomo in Florence

The 21 guilds, however, did not include the whole of Florence's working population and many people were excluded from the system, thus limiting their protection from exploitation and ability to be involved in city politics. Few of those in the textile industry, including the Ciompi wool workers, were eligible for guild membership, with around only 200 of the approximately 14,000 people in wool manufacture qualifying, and the remainder named the Sotto posti who were designated ineligible for entry to the guild system or for creating a guild for their own benefit. The exclusion of the Ciompi from this system reinforced unequal power relations within the city, reducing the rights and protections available for these workers unlike those assigned to members in other guilds. It was a highly unequal society allowing Florence's wool trade to thrive and set the stage for the revolt.

The Ciompi resented the controlling power that was centred in the Arte della Lana—the textile-manufacturing establishment which guided the economic engine of Florence's prosperity—and was supported by the other major guilds as well as the limitations they faced in influencing politics, and the lower wages and exploitation they experienced as a result of their exclusion from the guild system. The consequent revolt of 1378 marked the high point of labour agitation in Florence.

=== Three phases ===
The Ciompi revolt occurred in three phases. These consisted a stage of reform in the months of May and June, the "revolution", or violent outburst of the revolt occurring in mid-July, and the fall of the temporary Ciompi government – the "reaction", which occurred at the end of August. In June 1378, the series of events began with the fourteen minor guilds of Florence demanding greater representation in civic office. Initially the Ciompi were not violently involved and the early stages of the revolt were as much a power struggle between the guilds as it was between Florence's Signoria and the exploited lower class. The guildsmen who demanded this greater representation in government still sought to keep the Sotto posti from forming guilds and thereby being able to gain a political position. However, the Sotto posti soon submitted their own demands and hoped to have them met. The Signoria had no intention of granting the un-guilded Sotto posti these liberties however and instead, feeling threatened, made it more difficult to obtain office and quadrupled the fee for admittance. This action sparked indignation and turned the Sotto posti, who were previously hopeful for better rights and social/professional advances, into opponents of the Signoria, aligning their aims and ailments with those of the lower class Ciompi. Salvestro de Medici was one of the individuals assigned the blame by many in the lower classes, and later also faced accusation from his peers for letting the situation with the Ciompi get out of hand.

==== Reform ====
On 22 June 1378, the first outbreak of violence occurred when the un-guilded wool-workers took up arms and attacked government buildings, monasteries and a number of Palazzi whilst also releasing inmates from city prisons. Nevertheless, it was yet to become a full blown revolt. The Signoria attempted to appease the lower classes through talks and petitions, although ultimately suggested little change and still left the Ciompi guildless and without power or representation in government. The procrastination of the Signoria and half measures adopted therefore is perhaps what contributed to the second phase of the revolt.

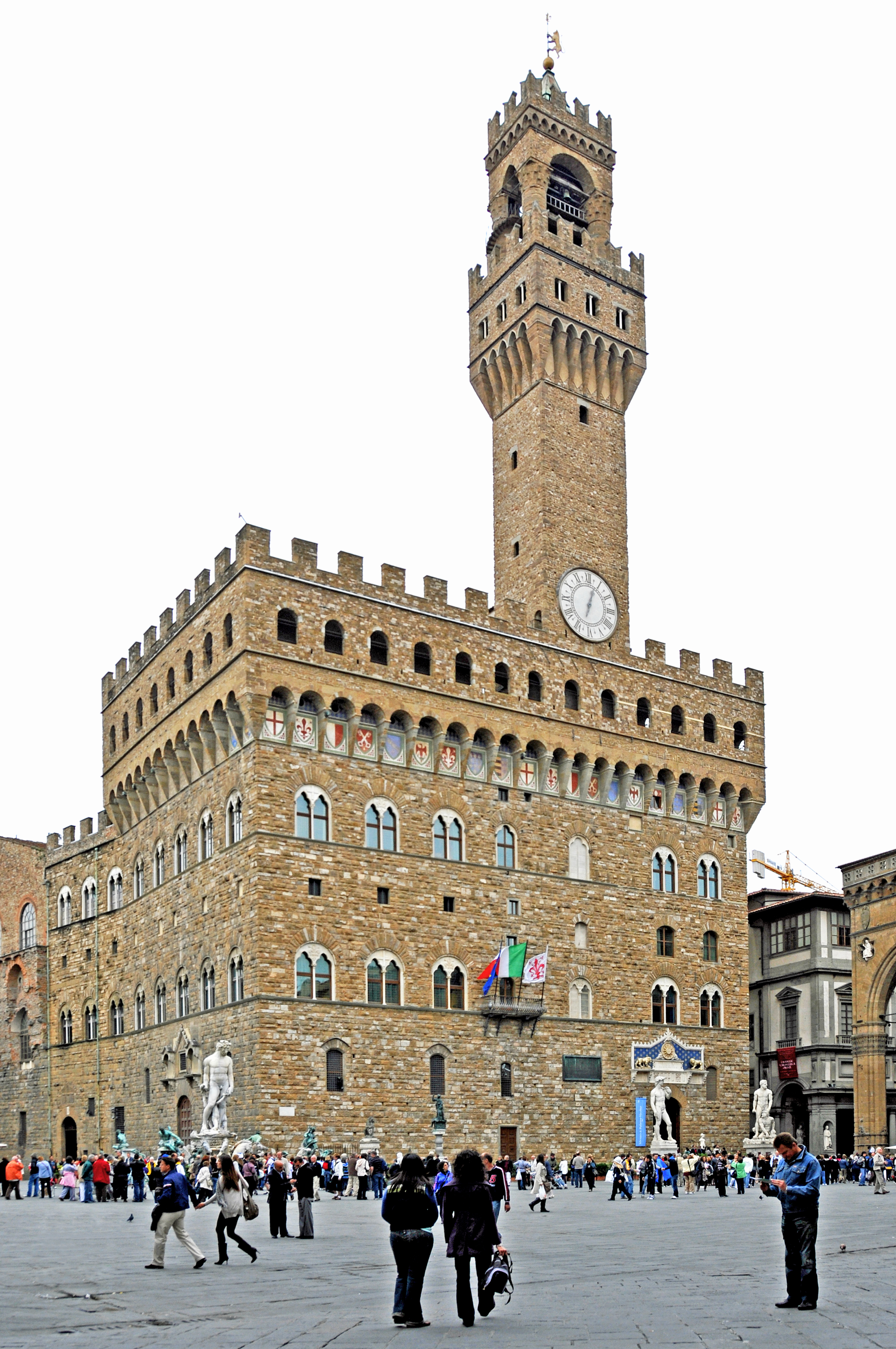
The Palazzo Vecchio, completed in 1314

==== Revolt ====
On 21 July, the lower classes forcibly took over the government, placing the wool carder Michele di Lando in the executive office of gonfaloniere of justice, and showing their banner, the blacksmith's flag, at the Bargello, the palace of the podestà. On this day, thousands of armed wool workers (the Ciompi) and those from the Sotto posti, besieged the Signoria and pointedly hanged the public executioner by his feet in front of the Palazzo Vecchio. The Ciompi then compelled the governing body, the Signoria, to establish three additional guilds in order to grant them access to political office. In demanding the creation of an arte del popolo minuto, the Ciompi requests were not especially radical: they were simply demanding the same rights the other minor guilds currently had. Most of the Ciompi (and Sotto Posti involved) aimed for reform rather than radical or revolutionary innovation. The total membership of the three new guilds was roughly 13,000 men whereas the twenty-one previously existing guilds had a membership of about 4000 to 5000 between them. After the incorporation of these new guilds, almost every man in Florence was able to participate in city government.

Considering the militancy with which the Ciompi had seized power, their demands both politically and socially, were modest. Their main concerns included the formation of a guild for wool workers and they also wished to tackle unemployment by increasing wool production. The Ciompi in fact did not demand ownership of cloth production or the cloth factories and their ideals were still based around the traditional guild idea, wishing to protect their economic interests and the situation of their workers.

However the new Ciompi government, once they had pushed out the Signoria, experienced early problems. While they made demands such as the right to elect three of their own priors, the reduction of judicial corporal punishment, and reform of the tax system, the new government was rather weak and lacked strong bargaining skills. An analysis of those within the newly appointed Balia suggests that only half were actually Ciompi, the rest being of middle class and other professions. The clash of interests and resulting struggle and sense of betrayal experienced by the Ciompi when their leader Michele di Lando turned against them, ignoring their demands, led to the third stage of the revolt.

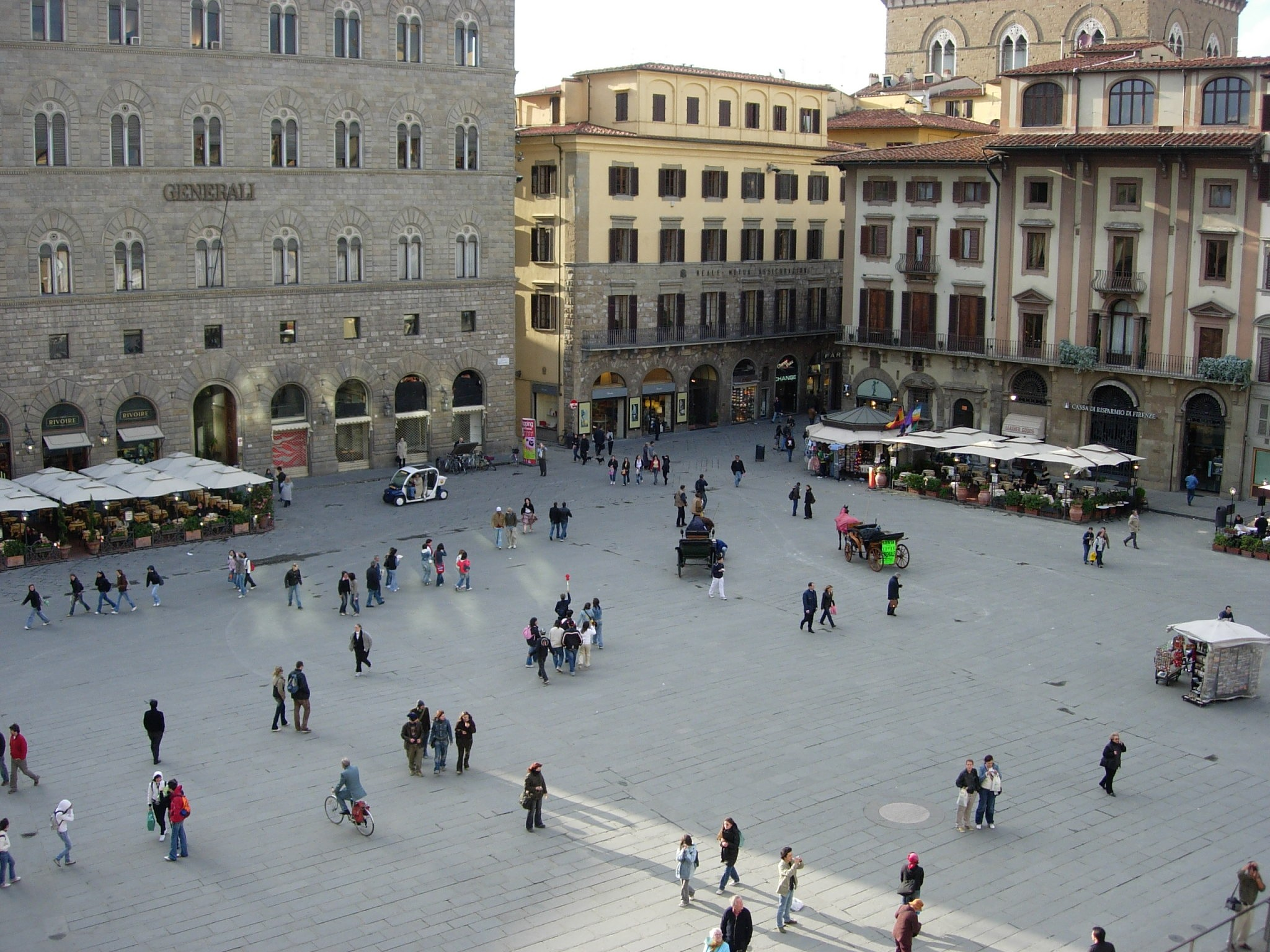
Piazza della Signoria

==== Reaction ====
At the end of August 1378, factionalism among the Ciompi and the radical persecution of enemies of the revolution, led di Lando to arrest two Ciompi leaders who had demanded constitutional reform. The next day, di Lando rode out of the palace with the standard bearer of justice and cleared the piazza of a militia from the three new guilds who were shouting "Long live the popolo minuto" and demanding the resignation of di Lando's government. The workers' militia returned and a battle for the Piazza della Signoria broke out between the Ciompi and the forces of the major and minor guilds led by the guild of butchers. The Ciompi and Sotto posti were slaughtered that day by the other guilds alongside the reformist forces under previous Ciompi leader di Lando, who also acted to crush the Eight Saints who were attempting to challenge his power in government. This day has been named one of the bloodiest in Florentine history.

On 1 September citizens assembled in the piazza and approved the dissolution of the Ciompi guild. Nevertheless, the government continued to enact Ciompi-led reforms, such as the establishment of the estimo—a direct tax on household wealth on 29 October 1378. Overall, the Ciompi revolt consisted of complex social, economic and political factors, as well as the involvement of more than one group of workers such as the Ciompi. The hierarchical guild system played an important part in the conflict, as did guild members who were key in turning on the government and ending its short reign over the city. Although often portrayed as radical today, the demands and wishes of the wool workers and others involved were fairly modest and reform did not take the shape of a societal overhaul. The idea that the Ciompi could live harmoniously with all the other groups and guilds in society after they assumed government, however, was idealistic. Furthermore, the disillusionment experienced when the conflict continued especially after the collapse of the regime and the guilds dissolution certainly contributed to the decline of labour unrest in Florence's cloth industry in the years following and lack of political power that these sections of society continued to have.

== Key figures ==
=== Salvestro de' Medici ===
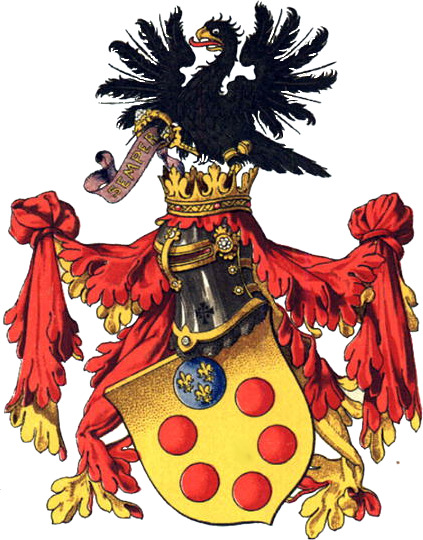
The "augmented coat of arms of the Medici, Or, five balls in orle gules, in chief a larger one of the arms of France (viz. Azure, three fleurs-de-lis or) was granted by Louis XI in 1465.

As "a man of a noble house, great and rich", Salvestro de' Medici was a lesser known cousin to the famous House of Medici banking family. He was blamed for causing the rebellion of the Ciompi by his peers (such as Alamanno Acciaioli, who was part of the Signory that brought the papal war to an end). Salvestro made an error in his struggle against the Guelf party, thus spoiling his family image as well as others of similar rank, "subjecting them to the rashness of the excited multitude".

=== "The Eight (Saints)" ===
Very little is actually known about "The Eight (Saints)" and who the members were. Trexler calls the radical Ciompi rebel group Gli Otto Santi del Popolo di Dio (or the "Eight Saints", also known as the Eight of Santa Maria Novella) and suggests that they may be commonly confused with the more influential and better known otto della guerra (or the "Eight of War") who represented Florence and opposed Gregory XI and the Catholic Church in 1375 (in the War of the Eight Saints). The "Eight of War" were very much in power at the time of the Ciompi Revolt, however they played a very small role during the actual Ciompi Revolt. The "Eight Saints" of the Popolo Minuto created itself as a shadow government to Michele di Lando's government they forcefully obtained the right to veto communal legislation. Di Lando's government defeated these radical challengers on 31 August 1378.

=== Michele di Lando ===
There is very little recorded history about who Michele di Lando was before the Ciompi Revolt, because men of the lower working class did not leave behind major documents. What is known is that he was a woolcomber, his mother was a washerwoman, and his wife ran a pork butcher's shop. Within his industry, di Lando was the foreman of all the menial workers and made enough money to show up in tax records as paying small sums. He was also a caporale during the war of Papal States, he shared command over twenty-eight men with another caporale (It is not known if he saw active service at that time, but the fact that he was trained in command and with arms, he was likely less docile than simple workers in his industry).

His ascension to the position of Signore and Gonfaloniere was literally a story about a man who went from rags to riches. He walked into the Palace barefooted and took control at the people's request. This scene inspired awe even in the eyes of some of the Signory (despite their compromised position). Alamanno Acciaioli was quoted saying, "... He [di Lando] was given the Signory and they [the people] wished him to be Standard-Bearer of Justice and lord (signore)... this Michele di Lando, wool comber, was lord of Florence for twenty-eight hours and more. This is the result of quarrelsomeness and innovation! O dear Lord, what great miracles you show us!..." Upon Michele di Lando's ascension to power, the "Eight of War" (who thought themselves as effective rulers of Florence) wanted to appoint replacements for the Signory. Di Lando dismissed them, wanting to show that he could govern without their assistance, and chose the electoral candidates himself. Once he secured his power, di Lando's government allied with the Popolo di Firenze, infuriating radical members of the Popolo Minuto (who elected their "Eight Saints" to oppose di Lando). After the final clash with the radicals, the Signory retook office at the end of Michele di Lando's term. This regime did not last long, it was overthrown again in 1382 and di Lando was sent into exile as a collaborator with the Signory.

== Revolt's end, reflection, and impact ==
=== End of Ciompi control ===
The city of Florence was governed by the Ciompi until 1382 when fear of foreign incursion and a prolonged dispute between the wool merchants and the dyers was used to justify an intervention by the elite families on behalf of a disintegrating government. Delegitimizing the new established guilds and removing them from constitutional functions became a main objective of the post-1382 regime that repealed the guild government's reforms. City government engaged in a concerted campaign to depict the non-guilded workers as criminal and heretical.

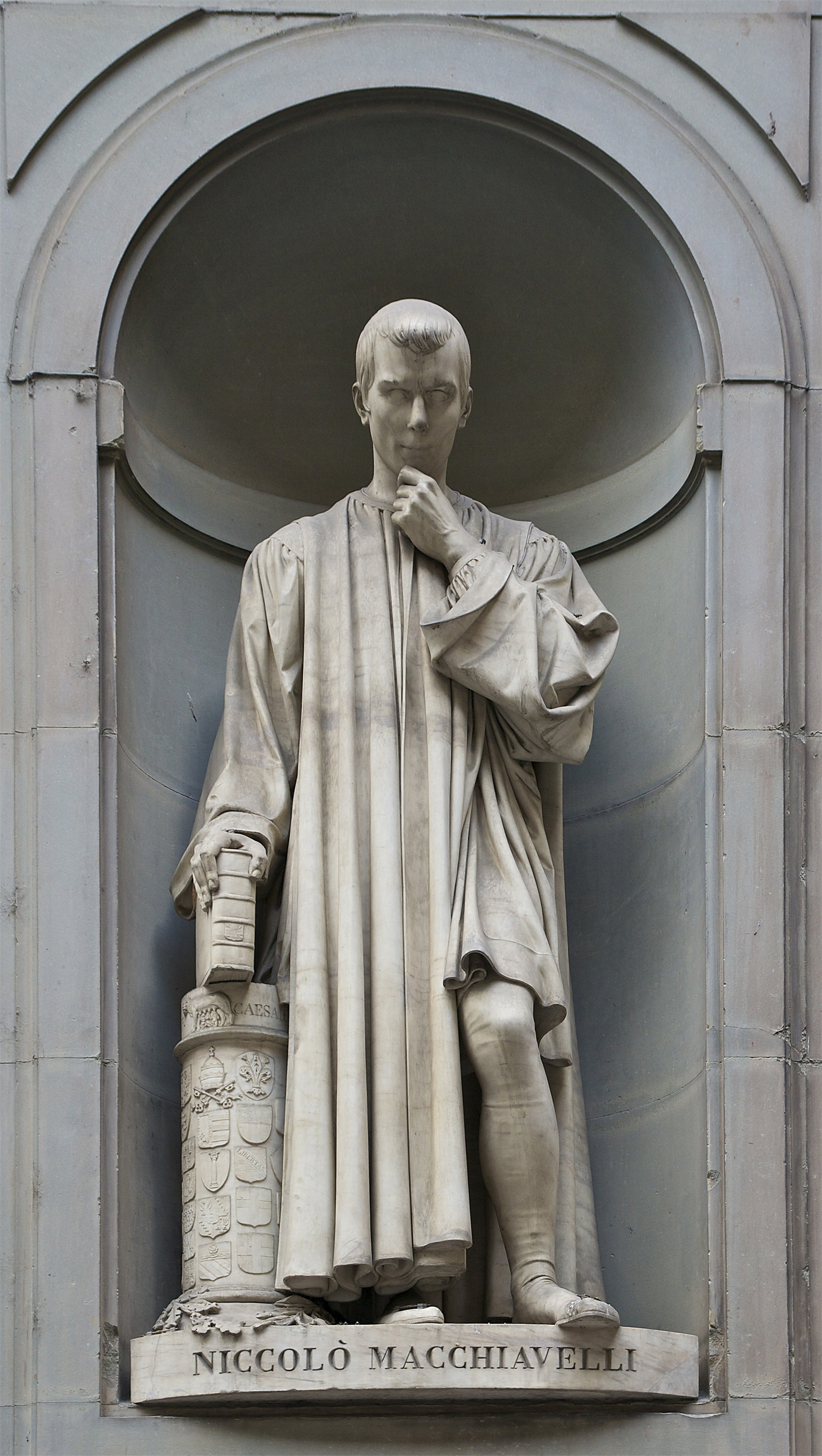
Statue of Niccolò Machiavelli at the Uffizi

The Ciompi Rebellion was not particularly long, lasting only for three and a half years (1378–1382). Yet, it not only reflected the long-existing social issue of late 14th-century Florence, but also constituted a long-lasting impact on many generations to come. It greatly influenced Florentine society in the 15th century, and became a memorable moment of Florentine history, which historians of later centuries all showed great interest in, but interpreted the same event in a variety of different ways.

=== Reflection on problems in late 14th-century Florence ===
Late 14th-century Florence was not a harmonious city, but one that had long been filled with tensions. The two major tensions were social and political, accumulating since Florence's commercial revolution 150 years prior to the rebellion. Social tension existed between the poor Ciompi and wealthy merchants who dominated the lucrative wool industry, and the Florentine government, which continued to increase taxation. The political tension was between the Ciompi, gente nuova, and the oligarchy, with the former two challenging the latter for more participation in government. The Ciompi Rebellion was the eruption of these long-existing tensions, which could no longer be contained.

=== Impacts on 15th-century Florence ===
After the Ciompi Uprising, the restored Florentine government did attempt to alleviate the plight of Ciompi artisans, such as a reform to lessen the burden of taxation. Yet, the rebellion left a permanent scar in the Florentine elites' mind (both the new and the old nobility) and created their everlasting fear and hatred toward the Ciompi. This scar built a tension between the new nobility and the lower labouring class greater than that prior to the uprising, as the elites constantly feared the rabble's secret plots. The elites thus began to favour a more authoritative government, which may be more centralized and stronger in crushing a revolt. This eventually gave rise to the Medici family, the most powerful banking family of Florence, whose power outweighed Salvestro de' Medici's bad reputation, and became the de facto ruler of Florence in the 15th century, drastically changing the character of the Florentine communal government.

=== Impacts on historians from different eras ===
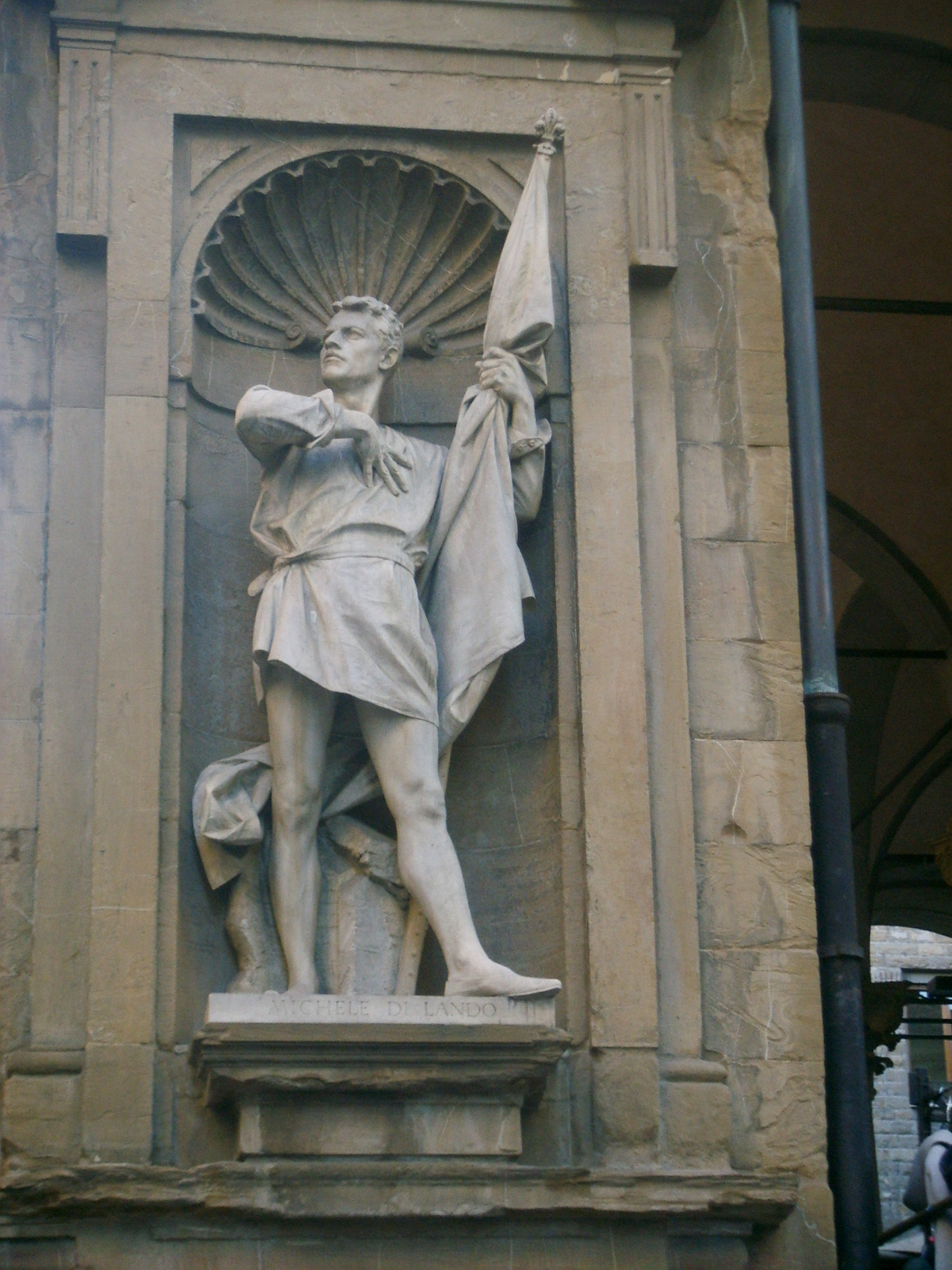
Statue of Michele di Lando, Loggia del Mercato Nuovo, Florence

In the 15th century, it would not be surprising for Florentine scholars, who were part of the elite, to view the uprising negatively. Leonardo Bruni regarded the uprising as a mob out of control, whose members viciously looted and murdered the innocent. He viewed this event as a historical cautionary tale, which presented the horrendous consequence when rabbles managed to seize control from the ruling class.

In the 16th century, Niccolò Machiavelli harbored a somewhat different view than Bruni. Although he echoed Bruni's perspective, also referring to them as the mob, the rabbles, preoccupied by fear and hatred, he was more favorable than Bruni in viewing the event as a whole. According to Machiavelli, the revolt was a social phenomenon between one group of people, who were determined to obtain freedom, while the other determined to abolish it. Machiavelli also included a dramatic yet exaggerated speech from one of the leaders of the plebian party (possibly Michele di Lando) that echoed sentiments from his later political works.

In the 19th century, however, historians began to show sympathy to the Ciompi. Romantic historians had a tendency to interpret history as an epic tale between the evil and good, and this applied to the Ciompi Rebellion. Romantic historians regarded Michele di Lando, the leader of the rebellion, as a hero to the people who fought against their ruthless oppressors. In the late nineteenth century, a sculpture of the popular leader Michele di Lando was placed in a niche on the façade of the Loggia del Mercato Nuovo. Marxist historians also sympathized with the Ciompi artisans, viewing them as the early proletariat, who tried to overthrow the oppressive bourgeoisies.

Recent histories treat the conflict as a lens reflecting the issues of Florentine society in the late 14th century, and also as a catalyst for Florence's period politics. Moreover, to them, the rebellion is a lens that reflects history as an ever changing entity, as historians living in different times have different "presents", and one's present dictates how one views the past.
