= Florentine Histories =

Historical account of Florence by Machiavelli

Florentine Histories (Italian: Istorie Fiorentine) is an account of the history of the city of Florence by Italian Renaissance political philosopher and writer Niccolò Machiavelli, first published posthumously in 1532.

== Background ==
In 1520, Machiavelli managed to get back into the good graces of the Medici family, so much so that Giulio Cardinal de Medici commissioned him to write a history of Florence. He was introduced to Giulio de Medici by way of his friends in the Orti Oricellari, and was well received by him. At this point, Machiavelli had two other job offers, one as chancellor of Ragusa (Dubrovnik) and another as chancellor to the condottiere Prospero Colonna, the latter offering a salary four times higher than his history commission. Despite the financial incentive and the urging of his former boss, Piero Soderini, Machiavelli declined both offers. He chose instead to write the Florentine Histories, aligning himself with esteemed humanist predecessors like Bruni and Poggio. The commission also hinted at potential future diplomatic work, which may have influenced his decision, as it offered a path back to political engagement similar to his earlier career.

The finished work was presented officially to Giulio de' Medici, now Pope Clement VII, in May 1526. The Pope liked the work, rewarded him, and asked him for support in the creation of a national army, in the preparations for the War of the League of Cognac. However, after the Sack of Rome (1527) and the fall of the Medici government in Florence, Machiavelli eventually hoped to gain favor with the new government. Machiavelli would die soon afterwards.

== Composition ==
The first of the eight books is a general picture of the history of Europe from the fall of the Western Roman Empire to the beginning of the 15th century; the second book begins to discuss the history of Florence, with the narration of the Ciompi revolt in 1378. The books II, III, and IV narrate the history before the Medici rise, while the last four speak of the fight for power that ended with the Medicean lordship. The eighth book closes with the death of Lorenzo il Magnifico, in 1492, with the end of the peace that Lorenzo's politics of balance had carried.

== The work ==
Machiavelli followed the tradition of humanist historians by structuring his work as "histories," organizing it into books with introductory sections and crafted speeches presented as authentic records. However, his narrative unfolds in a broader, almost philosophical framework, being a struggle between virtue and fortune. Central to the Florentine Histories is Florence’s destructive factionalism, which, unlike the productive conflicts of ancient Rome, left the city fragmented and morally decayed. Like his Discourses on Livy, the work includes subtle critiques of the Church and character sketches, particularly of the Medici, with the narrative pivoting around Cosimo de’ Medici’s return from exile in 1434. It also contains a notably dramatic speech attributed to Michele di Lando, leader of the 1378 Ciompi Revolt, which briefly established Florence’s most democratic government. He also relays in detail the Pazzi conspiracy against the Medici, and the means by which it was put down. While not a modern historian, Machiavelli demonstrates a commitment to factual analysis through his focus on "diverse effects," and he tended to combine historical detail with the political insight he gained from his career. Scholar Michelle T. Clarke has noted a theme of critique against the humanist tradition, which has been said to dominate Florentine intellectual circles in Machiavelli's day. Machiavelli attempted to describe as accurately as possible the methods of which the Medici family were able to take power in Florence, and how they overcame their rivals, despite his worries in potentially offending his Medici patron. Salvatore Di Maria states that Machiavelli's "cyclical approach of history" is most evident within the first eight books of the Istorie. He also asserts that, for Machiavelli, ambition plays a large role as the driving force in human action. While some scholars have viewed that Machiavelli takes a "conservative" turn against democratic republicanism in the Florentine Histories, John P. McCormick argues against this, stating that there is "no reason" to assume that Machiavelli abandoned the political ideas which he had outlined in The Prince and The Discourses. Alexander Duff claimed that Machiavelli dissented against the "neoclassical" understanding of Florence's founding, showing that political dialogue was not efficacious in solving factional strife. Jurdjevic questioned the ultimate reliability of Machiavelli's history through his treatment of Francesco Valori.
