= War of the Eight Saints =

1375–78 war in the Italian Peninsula

Date	1375 – July 1378
Location	Italian Peninsula
Result	Peace treaty concluded at Tivoli

Belligerents
Papal States	Coalition of Italian city-states: Republic of Florence; Milan; Republic of Siena

Commanders and leaders
John Hawkwood ^{α} Robert of Geneva ^{β}	Otto della Guerra
- ^{α}Until 1377^{β}From 1377

The War of the Eight Saints (1375–1378) was a war between Pope Gregory XI and a coalition of Italian city-states led by Florence that contributed to the end of the Avignon Papacy.

== Causes ==
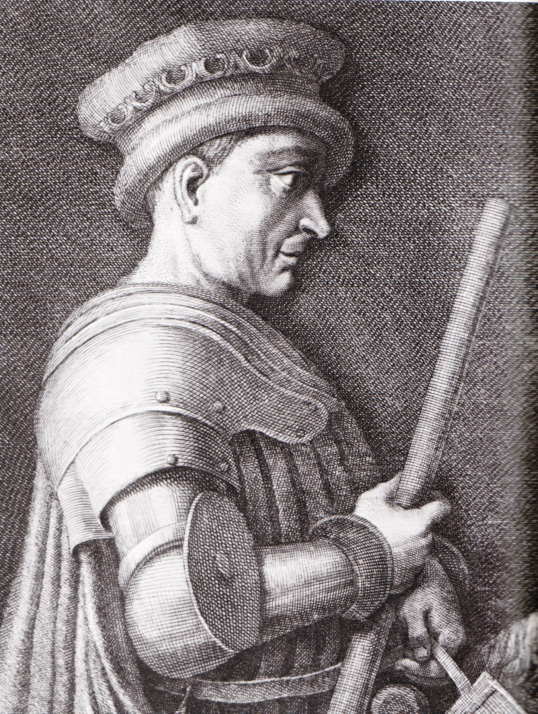
John Hawkwood, papal condottiere in Gregory XI's wars against Milan

The causes of the war were rooted in interrelated issues, Florentine opposition to the expansion of the Papal States in central Italy (which the Avignon Popes had set as a condition for their return), and antipathy toward the Parte Guelfa in Florence. Specifically, Florence feared in the autumn of 1372 that Gregory XI intended to reoccupy a strip of territory near Lunigiana, which Florence had conquered from Bernabò Visconti, and that the Ubaldini might switch from Florentine to Papal allegiance.

Gregory XI also harbored various grievances against Florence for their refusal to aid him directly in his war against the Visconti of Milan. When Gregory XI's war against Milan ended in 1375, many Florentines feared that the pope would turn his military attention toward Tuscany; thus, Florence arranged a nonaggression pact with the English condottiere John Hawkwood, who was Gregory XI's main military commander, at a cost of 130,000 florins, extracted from local clergy, bishops, abbots, monasteries and ecclesiastical institutions, by an eight-member committee appointed by the Signoria of Florence, the Otto dei Preti. Hawkwood also received a 600-florin annual salary for the next five years and a lifetime annual pension of 1,200 florins.

The transalpine mercenaries employed by Gregory XI against Milan, now unemployed, were often a source of friction and conflict in papal towns.

== War ==
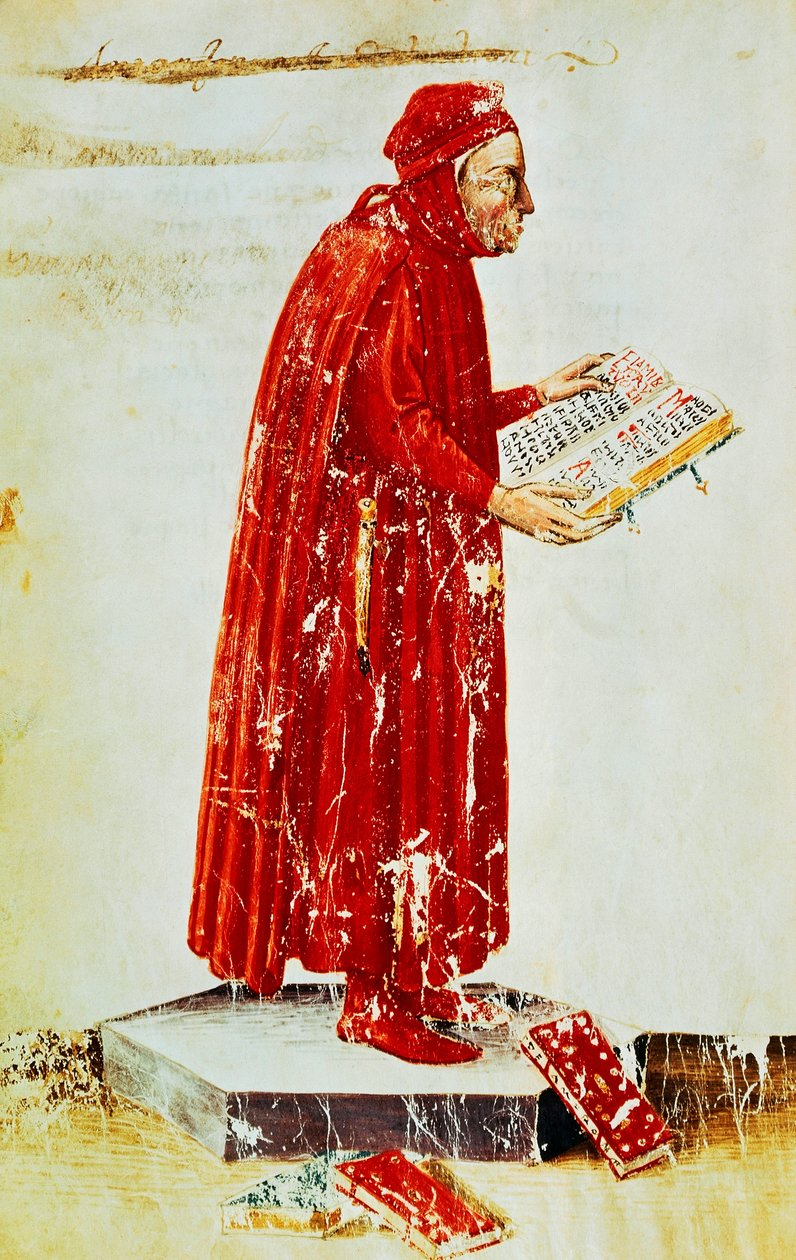
Coluccio Salutati, Chancellor of Florence during the war

Florence formed an alliance with Milan in July 1375, immediately prior to the outbreak of the war, and the prosecution of the war was entirely delegated to an eight-member committee appointed by the Signoria of Florence: the Otto della Guerra.

Florence incited a revolt in the Papal States in 1375. Florentine agents were sent to more than forty cities in the papal states—including Bologna, Perugia, Orvieto and Viterbo—to foment rebellion, many of which had only been re-submitted to papal authority by the efforts of Cardinal Gil Álvarez Carrillo de Albornoz. Humanist Chancellor of Florence Coluccio Salutati disseminated public letters urging the cities to rebel against the "tyrannical" and "corrupt" papal rule, instead urging a return to all'antica Republicanism.

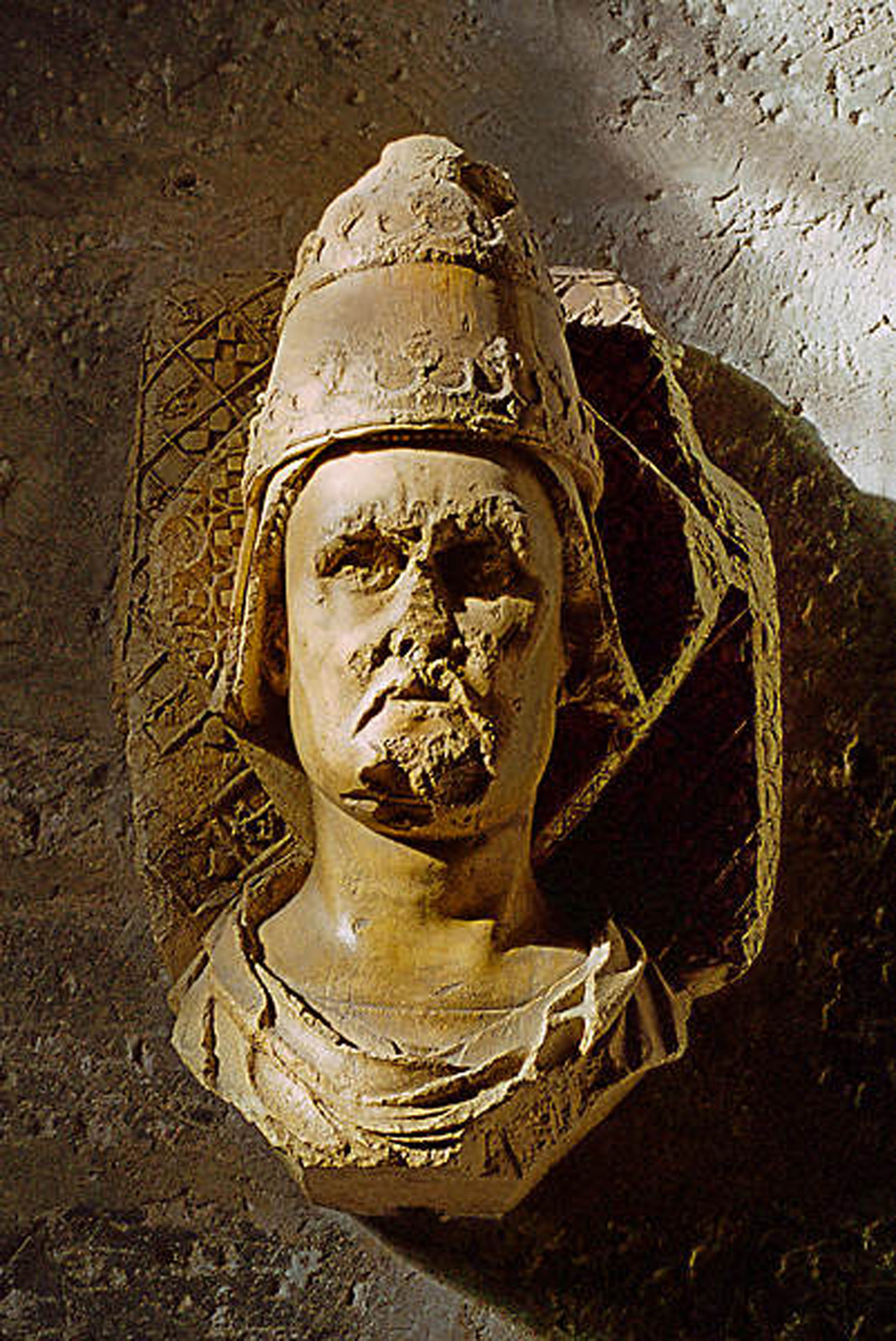
Robert of Geneva, future Avignon Pope Clement VII, the commander of papal forces after 1377

Pope Gregory XI excommunicated all members of the government of Florence and placed the city under interdict on March 31, 1376, banning religious services in Florence and legalizing the arrest and enslavement of Florentines and the confiscation of their property throughout Europe. Initially, rather than attempting to disobey the interdict, Florentines organized extra-ecclesiastical processions (including flagellants) and confraternities, including the re-emergence of groups such as the Fraticelli, who had previously been deemed heretical. The edifice of the Florentine inquisition was destroyed, and the Signoria rolled back legal restrictions on usury and other practices frowned on by the (now defunct) ecclesiastical courts.

However, in October 1377, the government of Florence forced the clergy to resume religious services causing Angelo Ricasoli, Bishop of Florence, and Neri Corsini, Bishop of Fiesole, to flee Florentine territory. The heavy fines and confiscations issued by the Signoria on prelates who left their posts, the "most extensive liquidation of an ecclesiastical patrimony attempted anywhere in Europe before the Reformation," may have been motivated to pay for the increasingly expensive conflict. The total cost of the war for Florence would reach approximately 2.5 million florins.

As a result of Gregory XI's economic sanctions, merchants of the Florentine "diaspora" were hurt economically throughout Europe, particularly the Alberti bankers in Avignon, although the interdict was ignored by many, including Charles V of France.

Hawkwood honored his agreement with the Florentines not to make war in Tuscany, limiting himself to putting down the various rebellions within the papal states; in 1377 Hawkwood abandoned Gregory XI entirely and joined the anti-papal coalition. Gregory XI's other condottieri also limited their activities to Romagna, notably the savage sacking of Cesena in February 1377 in what came to be known as the Cesena Bloodbath. In the spring of 1377, papal mercenaries recaptured Bologna, which up until that point had been a key Florentine ally.

In 1377, Cardinal Robert of Geneva (future Avignon Pope Clement VII) led the army of Gregory XI in an attempt to quell the revolt, and Gregory XI himself returned to Italy to secure his Roman possessions, de facto ending the Avignon Papacy. Gregory XI arrived in Rome in January 1377, after a difficult journey (including shipwreck), and died there in March 1378.

== Resolution ==
A peace conference met in Sarzana in February–March 1378 under the mediation of Bernabò Visconti. Besides the warring parties, the Holy Roman Empire and the kingdoms of France, Hungary, Spain and Naples sent representatives. Peace terms had been tentatively agreed when, on 31 March, the conference learned that Gregory XI had died. Visconti nonetheless transmitted the terms to the principal parties, but the conference broke up.

A peace treaty was finally concluded at Tivoli in July 1378, negotiated with Pope Urban VI. Under the treaty, Florence was to pay the Pope 200,000 florins (as opposed to Pope Gregory XI's original indemnity requirement of 1 million florins), repeal all laws placed against the Church by the secular government, and restore all property confiscated or looted from the clergy. The Pope, in return, was to repeal the interdict placed on Florence and mend the ecclesiastical community's diminished favor of Florence.

== Eight Saints ==
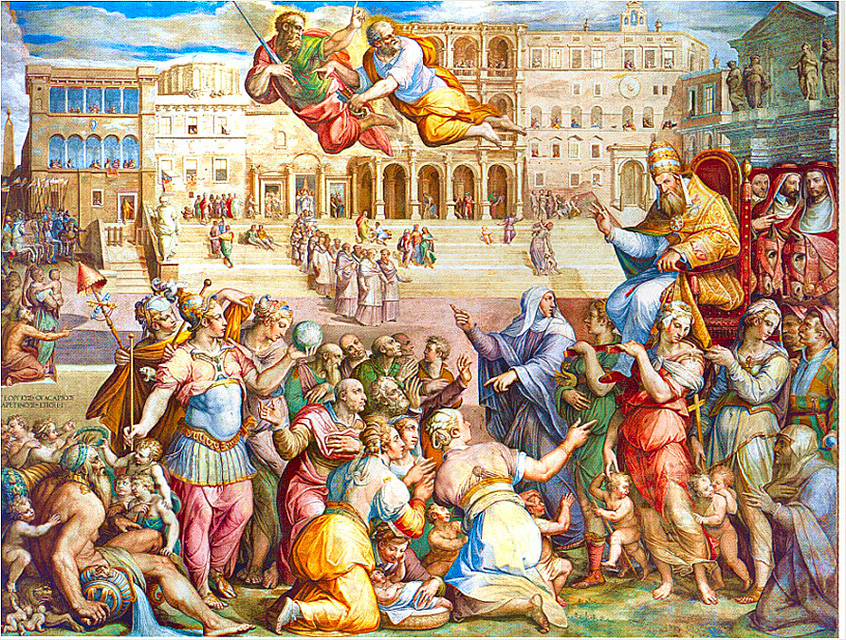
Pope Gregory XI's bull of excommunication referred to the "Eight Saints" as the "Eight of Priests".

The Eight Saints (Italian: Otto Santi) may refer to one, or both, of two eight-member Balìa appointed by the Signoria of Florence during the war. When Florence arranged a nonaggression pact with Hawkwood at a cost of 130,000 florins, a special commission of eight citizens was created to levy a one-year, forced loan on the clergy of Florence and Fiesole to cover the sum. A second council of eight men was later created to make the military and diplomatic arrangements necessary to carry on a war against the Pope.

The group identity of the Eight Saints remains a controversial subject. The levy committee is most widely accepted as the Otto Santi by scholars, though some argue that Otto Santi refers to the war council. The first historical reference to the Eight of War (Italian: Otto della Guerra) as the Otto Santi occurs in 1445 with the account of Florentine historian Domenico Buoninsegni; it does not appear in the accounts of contemporaries of the war such as Leonardo Bruni and Giovanni Morelli. Buoninsegni had applied the appellation—used in August 1378 to refer to an eight-member group (Gli Otto Santi del Popolo di Dio) formed by the Ciompi Revolt, which ensued immediately after the War of the Eight Saints—to the Otto della Guerra. In contrast, the moniker is used in the March 31, 1376 bull of excommunication to refer to the Otto dei Preti (the levy committee, literally meaning "Eight of Priests").

The Otto dei Preti, appointed July 7, 1375 to carry out the taxation of the clergy for the nonaggression pact included:

- Matteo Malefici
- Antonio di Forese Sacchetti
- Bardo di Guglielmo Altoviti
- Salvi Filippo Salvi
- Giovanni d'Angiolo Capponi
- Antonio di Filippo Tolosini
- Recco di Guido Guaza
- Michele di Puccio

The Otto della Guerra (war council) were appointed August 14, 1376 and consisted of four guild representatives and four members of the nobility.

Major guild representatives

- Giovanni Dini – Spices
- Guccio Gucci – Woollen-cloth manufacturing

Minor guild representatives

- Matteo Soldi – Wine retail
- Giovanni di Mone – Grain manufacturing

Members of elite Florentine families

- Alessandro de' Bardi
- Giovanni Magalotti
- Andrea Salvati
- Tommaso Strozzi
