= Guilds of Florence =

Secular corporations that controlled arts and trades

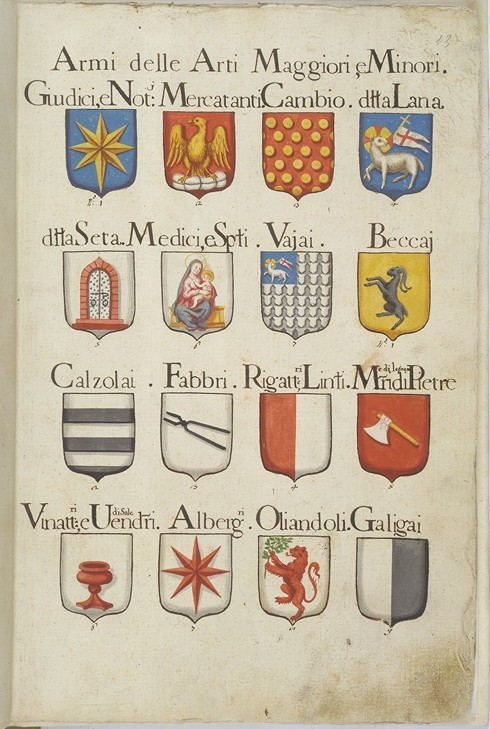
Coats of arms of the guilds of Florence, 18th century.

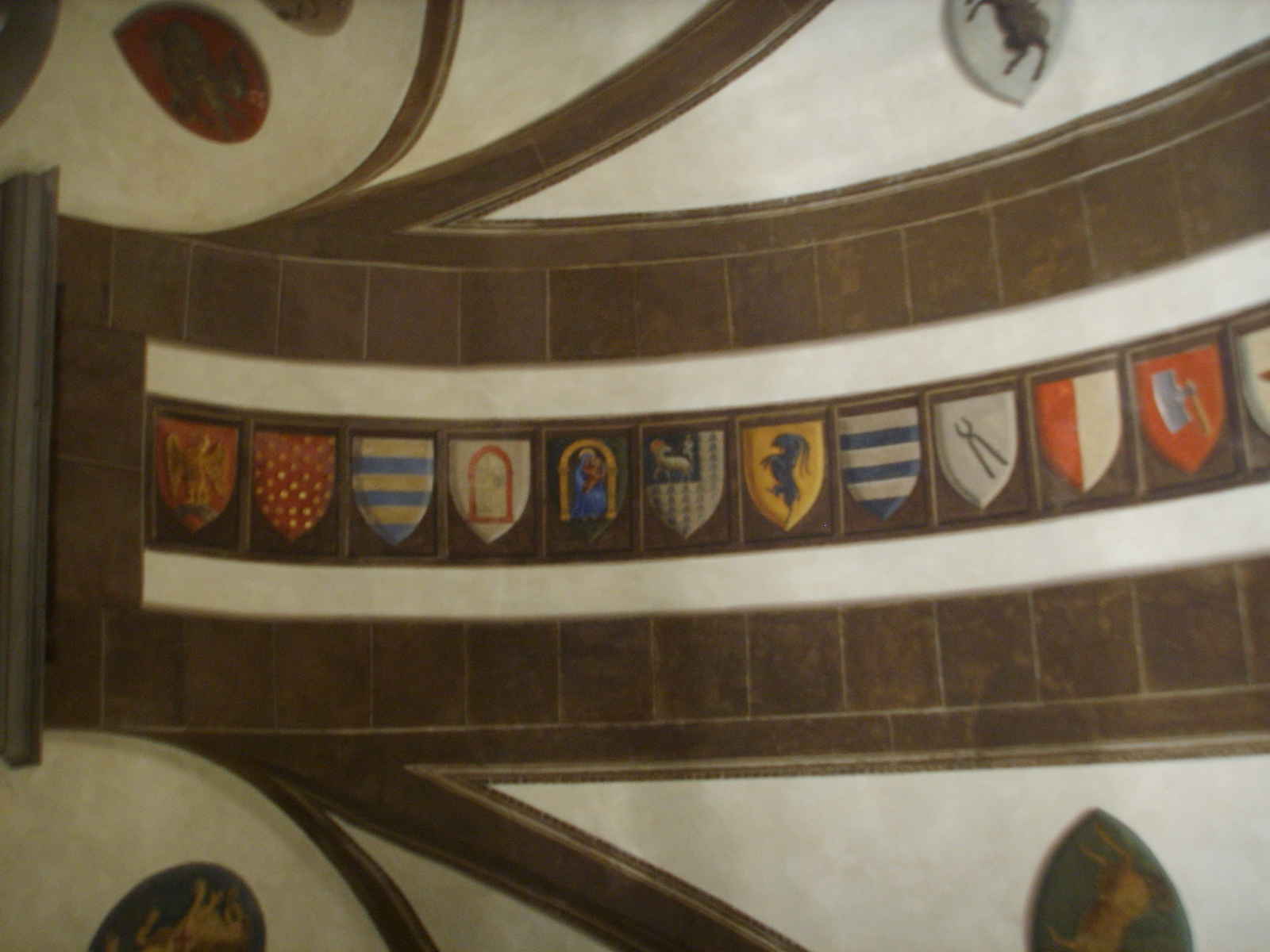
Symbols of the guilds in the Palazzo Spini Feroni in Florence

The guilds of Florence were secular corporations that controlled the arts and trades in Florence from the twelfth into the sixteenth century. These Arti included seven major guilds (collectively known as the Arti Maggiori), five middle guilds (Arti Mediane) and nine minor guilds (Arti Minori). Their rigorous quality control and the political role in the commune that the Arti Maggiori assumed were formative influences in the history of Florence, which became one of the richest cities of late medieval Europe.

The popolo minuto—skilled workers including weavers, spinners, dyers, boatmen, laborers, peddlers and others—despite constituting a majority of the population, were barred from forming guilds.

== Formation of the Arti ==
The guilds, medieval institutions that organized every aspect of a city's economic life, formed a social network that complemented and in part compensated for family ties, although in Florence the welfare side of the guilds' activities was less than in many cities. The first of the guilds of Florence of which there is notice is the Arte di Calimala, the cloth-merchants' guild, mentioned in a document of about 1150. By 1193 there existed seven such corporate bodies, which each elected a council whose members bore the Roman-sounding designation consoli. A single capo was elected to manage all the business of the guild.

Entrance to the Arti was highly structured from the first records; it was necessary to be the legitimate son of a member, to give proofs of competence in the craft involved, and to pay an entrance tax. Masters of the guilds, who possessed the means of production, took on apprentices and garzoni, the "boys" or journeymen who might work through a long career without ever becoming a master.

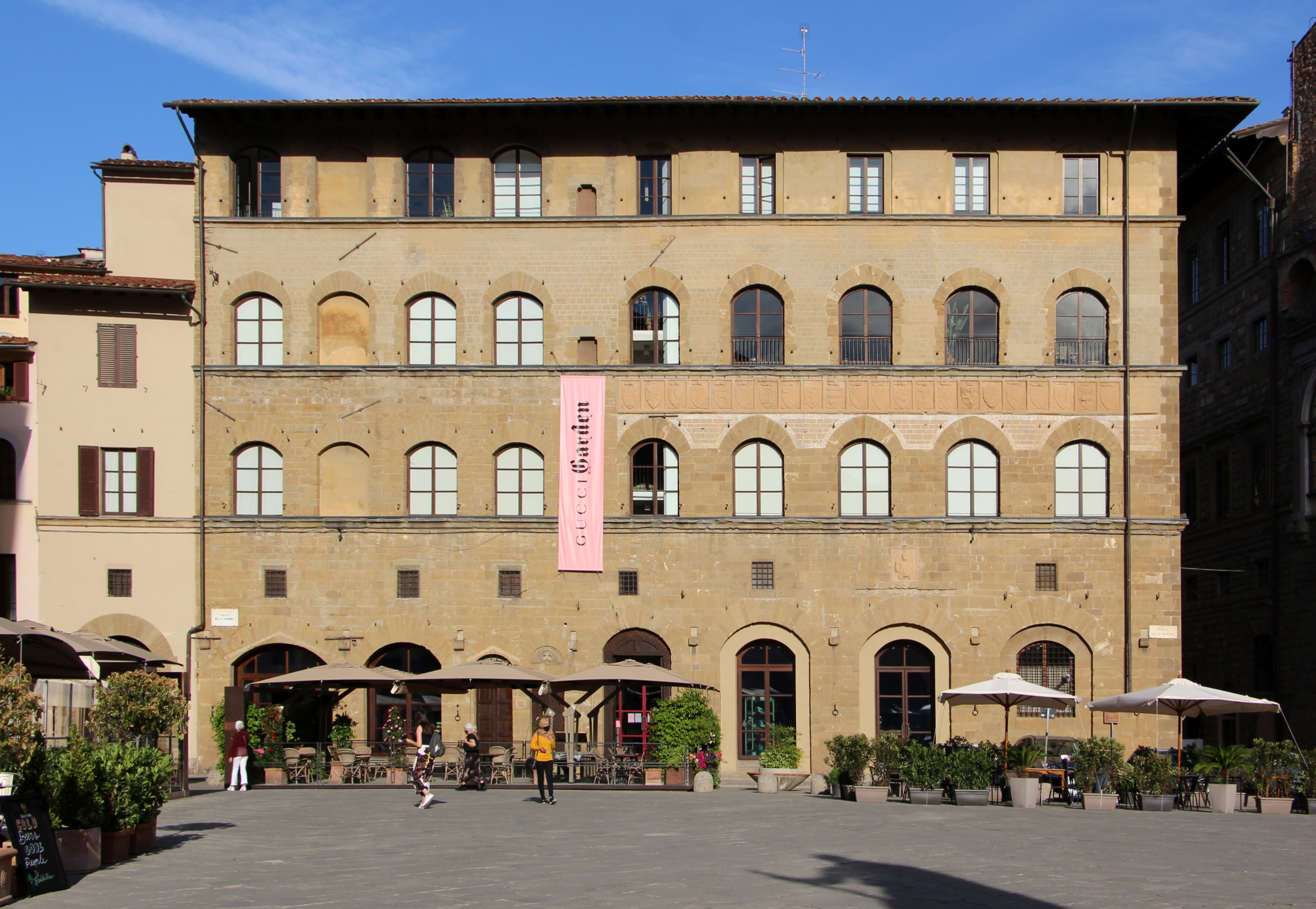
The Tribunale di Mercatanzia

Each of the Arti was ruled according to its statutes, which had the force of law, and might pass judgement in controversies among its members and with their workers. In the fourteenth century the guilds established the market tribunal called the Mercatanzia to hear causes that involved more than one of the Arti. The Palazzo del Tribunale della Mercatanzia (illustration, right) still occupies a prominent place in the piazza della Signoria, befitting the controlling role of the Arti in governing Florence.

As elsewhere, the guilds of Florence protected its members from competition within the city by strangers and Florentine outsiders, guaranteed the quality of work through strict supervision of the workshops (botteghe), stipulated work hours, established markets and feast days, and provided public services to its members, and their wives, widows and children. During the fifteenth century city watchmen were organized by the Arti to protect closed workshops and warehouses.

From the beginning, not all Arti were equal: to the original seven Arti Maggiori were added fourteen Arti Minori as the guild system spread.

== Role in Florence ==
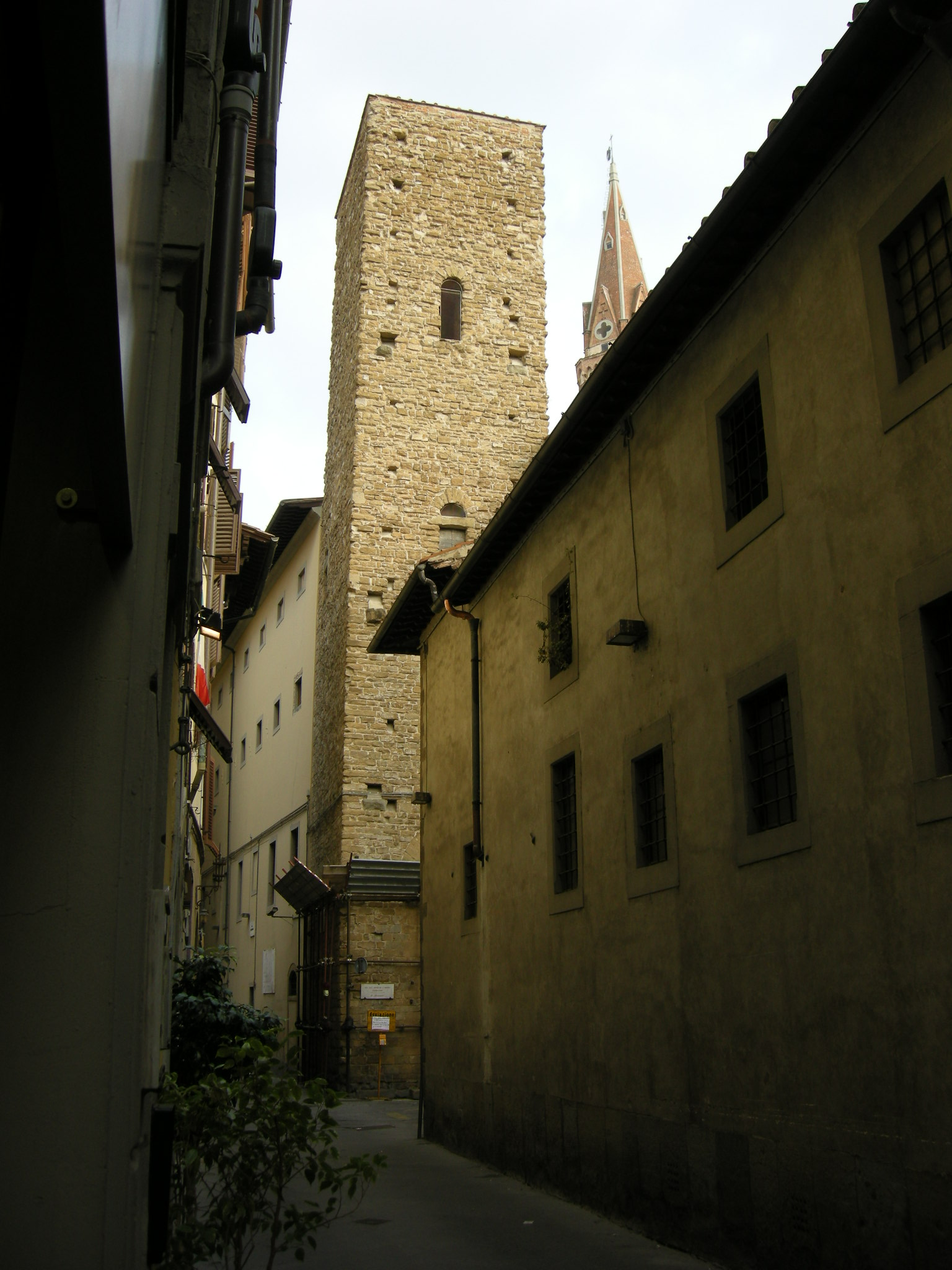
Torre della Castagna, early headquarters of the Priori of the Guilds of Florence

Six of the nine Priori of the Signoria of Florence were selected from the major guilds, and two were selected by the minor guilds. The "Seven Greater Guilds" are first mentioned distinctly (separating the Calimala[it] from the Wool Trades[it]) in 1197. The first State enactment appertaining to Guilds was not issued until 1228.

The first scheduled list of Florentine guilds encompassing twenty-one guilds, appeared in 1236. The second scheduled list of the twenty-one guilds, differentiating between seven "Greater" Guilds (Arti Maggiori) and fourteen "Lesser" Guilds (Arti Minori), appeared in 1266. That same year the consuls of the seven "Greater" Guilds became the "Supreme Magistrate of the State". In 1280, the first five of the "Lesser Guilds" were designated "Intermediate Guilds" (Arti Mediane), when the Signoria first assumed office, and their consults were admitted to the conferences of the consuls of the seven "Greater" Guilds.

In 1282, three "Priors of the Guilds" were elected, with powers only inferior to the Chief-Magistrate of the State. The third scheduled list of guilds, finalizing their order of precedence for over a century appeared in a 1282 document known as the Foro Fiorentino, currently held at British Library. The 1282 document groups the greater and intermediary guilds together, thus creating a new partition of twelve greater guilds and nine minor guilds. The nine lowest guilds were allotted banners and coats-of-arms in 1291.

A General Code, a "Statuto", for the guilds was promulgated in 1296 with the founding of the Corte della Mercanzia. The Statutes of all the guilds underwent a complete revision between 1301 and 1307, and the "New Code" was first adopted by the Calimala; the statutes were again revised in 1386.

Three new operative guilds were formed in 1378 after the Ciompi revolt. The fourth scheduled list of guilds, appearing in 1415, however, still included only twenty-one guilds, partitioned (as in 1266) between seven greater guilds and fourteen lesser guilds (the intermediary ones having lost their special status).

The greater guilds attempted in 1427 to reduce the lesser guilds to only seven. This was defeated. But in 1534, the fourteen lesser guilds were arranged into four Universities, and saw many of their privileges curtailed.

== Arti Maggiori ==
Major Guild	Symbol	Patronage	Founding	Order	Notes
Arte dei Giudici e Notai		Judges, lawyers, and notaries	1197	1	Listed first of the "Seven Major Guilds" in the 1236 list, and first of the "Twelve Greater Guilds" of the 1282 list currently at the British Museum; and once again first of the new "Seven Major Guilds" in the 1415 revision. Abolished in 1597, the same year a "College of Judges and Notaries" was incorporated.
Arte di Calimala		Merchants, finishers and dyers of foreign cloth	Circa 1190	2	Reportedly the oldest of the Florentine guilds, originally listed as the Mercantati o Arte di Calimala. From the early thirteenth century, it was one of the three major guilds (the others were the Bankers and the Wool manufacturers) entitled to elect Priori to the Signoria.
Arte della Lana		Wool manufacturers and merchants	Pre-1192	3 (1282); 4 (1236)	Elected a Prior from early thirteenth century. Fourth in precedence in 1236, rose to third in 1282. Took charge of Santa Maria del Fiore in 1282.
Arte del Cambio		Bankers and money-changers	Pre-1197	4 (1282); 3 (1236)	Elected a Prior from early thirteenth century.
Arte della Seta		Silk weavers and merchants	Pre-1192	5	Included bronze sculptors. Only began electing a Prior (representative to the Signoria) after 1283.
Arte dei Medici e Speziali		Physicians and pharmacists	1197	6	Elected Prior only after 1283. Included painters from 1314, and as an independent branch from 1378; also included shopkeepers who sold spices, dyes, and medicines.
Arte dei Vaiai e Pellicciai		Furriers and skinners	1197	7	Elected Prior only after 1283.

== Arti Mediane ==
Middle Guild	Symbol	Patronage	Founding	Order	Notes
Arte dei Beccai		Butchers and graziers	Circa 1236	8	First of the fourteen minor guilds (eighth overall) in 1236, first of the five intermediate guilds (1280) and once again first of the fourteen minor guilds (1415). Associated trades include the pescivendoli (fishmongers).
Arte dei Fabbri		Blacksmiths	Pre-1236	9 (1415); 10 (1236)	Given as the third of the minor guilds in 1236, and third of the intermediate guilds in 1285, it sneaked up and climbed up one position, over the shoemakers in 1415.
Arte dei Calzolai		Shoemakers	Pre-1236	10 (1415); 9 (1236)	Long the second minor guild, the shoemakers' guild slipped one position in 1415, giving way to the Fabbri (blacksmiths). In the 1280 list, it included the curriers (dressed leather workers), which were otherwise associated with the tanners.
Arte dei Maestri di Pietra e Legname		Master stonemasons and wood-carvers	Pre-1236	11 (1280); 12 (1236)	Listed as Muratori e Scarpellini (builders and stonemasons) in the 1236 list, and listed fifth in precedence among the minors (tanners & curriers was fourth). Raised to fourth in 1280, when tanners relegated. Included sculptors.
Arte dei Linaioli e Rigattieri		Linen manufacturers, retail cloth dealers and tailors	1266	12 (1280); 16 (1236)	Linen drapers and flax workers (linaiuoli) were a lowly ninth of the fourteen minor guilds in 1236. They were conjoined together with the rigattieri ("rag-dealers", i.e. retail cloth vendors) and raised to fifth of the intermediate guilds in 1280. In the 1282 list, the title is listed in short form as merely Rigattieri, and in 1295 expanded to Rigattieri, Linaiuoli, Sarti e Venditori di Pannilini (retail dealers, flax workers, tailors and vendors of linen cloth)

== Arti Minori ==
Minor Guild	Symbol	Patronage	Founding	Order	Notes
Arte dei Vinattieri		Vintners	1266	13 (1236)	The vintners (wine-dealers) steadily held their place as thirteen in the overall order of precedence. They were the sixth of the fourteen minor guilds in 1236 (before deduction of intermediaries in 1280) and first of the nine minor guilds in 1282. They were once again sixth of the fourteen minors in 1415.
Arte degli Albergatori		Innkeepers	1282	14 (1282); 21 (1236)	Innkeepers were originally the lowest of the fourteen minor guilds in the 1236 list. But they rocketed up in the ranking in the 1282 list, under the title of Albergatori maggiori (Master Innkeepers) to become the second of the nine minors (partly by taking elements of what used to be under vintners, e.g. tavernkeepers).
Arte dei Cuoiai e Galigai		Curriers and tanners	1282	15 (1415); 16 (1282); 11 (1236)	Curriers & tanners were listed in 1246 in the relatively high position of eleventh overall (fourth of the fourteen minor guilds, just above stonemasons). When the intermediary arts were separated in 1280, tanners were relegated and curriers (dressed leather workers) were temporarily joined with the shoemakers. In the 1282 list, under the title of Galigai grossi (master tanners) they became the fourth of the nine minor guilds, below the salt-vendors (five positions below their 1236 ranking). But they inched one place back up in the 1415 list.
Arte degli Oliandoli e Pizzicagnoli		Olive oil-merchants and provision-dealers	Pre-1236	16 (1415); 15 (1236)	Originally listed as the eighth of the fourteen minors in 1236. Provision-dealers were listed as "salt vendors" (Arte dei Venditori del Sale) in the 1282 and 1295 lists, as third of the nine minors. Renamed Oliandoli again thereafter. In 1328, the guild is noted as being associated with biadaiuoli (chandlers), casciaiuoli (cheesemakers), bicchierai (glassblowers), funai (twine pullers) and saponai (soap-boilers). The Oliandoli were relegated to fourth of the minors in 1415 (sixteenth overall), when tanners climbed up to third.
Arte dei Correggiai		Saddlers and harness-makers	Pre-1236	17 (1415); 19 (1236)	For a long time, the Correggiai held the relatively lowly place of the nineteenth guild in the overall ranking (twelfth of the fourteen minors in 1236, seventh of the nine minors in 1282.) It was listed in 1282 under the title Arte de' Sanollacciai e Coreggiai e Scudai (harness-makers, saddlers and shield-makers). Associated trade branches included frenai (bridle-makers, listed 1285), ronzoni (horse-dealers, 1309–16) and vaginari (scabbard-makers, 1321). In 1415, the saddlers leapfrogged two places in the ranking to become the fifth of the minor guilds.
Arte dei Chiavaiuoli		Locksmiths, toolmakers and braziers		18 (1415); 18 (1282); 17 (1236)	The locksmiths were the tenth of the fourteen minors in 1236 (seventeenth overall). They were listed as sixth of the nine minors in 1282 (falling one place, below armourers) under the expanded title of Arte dei Chiavaiuoli e Ferraiuoli – Vecchi e Nuovi (Locksmiths and Iron-workers old and new) (ferraiuoli can be translated as edge toolmakers). In 1301-09, the guild was referred to as the Chiavaiuoli, Ferraiuoli e Calderai (locksmiths, toolmakers and braziers), but the title was shortened again to merely Chiavaiuoli in 1415, and once again ranked above the armourers (albeit below the ascendant saddlers, thus remaining eighteenth overall).
Arte dei Corazzai e Spadai		Armourers and swordsmiths	Pre-1236	19 (1415); 17 (1282); 18 (1236)	The armourers were ranked eleventh of the fourteen minors of 1236 (eighteenth overall), rose one place to become fifth of the nine minors of 1282 (edging above locksmiths), but fell back two places in 1415, when the locksmiths and saddlers rose above it, leaving it twelfth of the fourteen minors.
Arte dei Legnaioli		Carpenters	Pre-1236	20 (1236)	The carpenters always occupied the next-to-last place in the guild ranking. They were the thirteenth of the fourteen minors in 1236, eighth of the nine minors in 1282 and once again thirteenth of fourteen minors in 1415.
Arte dei Fornai		Bakers and millers	Pre-1236	21 (1282); 14 (1236)	The bakers started out in the relatively lofty position of as the seventh of fourteen minor guilds in 1236 (fourteenth overall). But in 1282 they were relegated to the lowest in the order of precedence (ninth of the nine minor guilds) and remained the lowest ranked guild in 1415.

== Artists ==
In Florence a separate Guild of Saint Luke for artists did not exist. Painters belonged to the guild of the Doctors and Apothecaries (Arte dei Medici e Speziali) as they bought their pigments from the apothecaries, while sculptors were members of the Masters of Stone and Wood (Maestri di Pietra e Legname), or the metalworkers if working in that medium. They were also frequently members in the confraternity of St. Luke (Compagnia di San Luca)—which had been founded as early as 1349—although it was a separate entity from the guild system. In the sixteenth century, the Compagnia di San Luca began to meet at SS. Annunziata, and sculptors, who had previously been members of a confraternity dedicated to St. Paul (Compagnia di San Paolo), also joined. This form of the compagnia developed into the Florentine Accademia e Compagnia delle arti del Disegno in 1563, which was then formally incorporated into the city's guild system in 1572.

The guilds were important patrons of the arts. The statues of the Orsanmichele were a lavish joint, and highly competitive, effort, the Calimala were responsible for the Baptistry and paid for Ghiberti's famous doors, while the Lana were responsible for the cathedral itself, and paid for the cupola, the altar frontal and other works, and the Seta built and ran the Ospedale degli Innocenti.

== Universities ==
Given the prominent role of the guilds in the government of Florence, in 1427, Florentine greater nobles, led by Rinaldo degli Albizzi and Niccolò da Uzzano, attempted to introduce measures in the Signoria of Florence to reduce the number of minor guilds from fourteen to seven, thereby reducing the number of their representatives in the government. This attempt was narrowly defeated, largely by the singular efforts of Giovanni di Bicci de' Medici, an action which cemented the popularity of the Medici family among the common burghers (against the Grandi) and helped them rise to power. But a little over a century later, another Medici, Cosimo I de' Medici, reduced the number of minor guilds from fourteen to four, by grouping disparate guilds together into "universities". The four new universities organized by the law of July 17, 1534 were:

- L'Università di Por San Piero ("University of St. Peter's Gate") – grouped together the Beccai (butchers), Oliandoli (provisioners) and the Fornai (bakers).
- l'Università de' Fabbricanti ("University of Artificers") – grouped together the guilds of Chiavaiuoli (locksmiths), Maestri di Pietre e Legnami (masters of stone and wood), Corazzai e Spadai (armourers) and Legnaiuoli (carpenters).
- l'Università de' Maestri di Cuoiame ("University of Masters of Leather") – grouped the Calzolai (shoemakers), Galigai (Tanners) and Coreggiai (saddlers).
- l'Università de' Linaiuoli ("University of Linen-drapers") added to the old Linaiuoli guild not only the associated Rigattieri (retailers) and Sarti (tailors), but also the unrelated Vinattieri (vintners) and Albergatori (innkeepers).

The university of Cuoiame was annexed in 1561 by the major guild of Vaiai e Pellicciai (Furriers and Skinners), and the new entity named Arte dei Vaiai e Cuoiame. The universities of San Piero and Fabbricanti were merged in 1583, into a single university, the Università dei Fabbricanti e Por San Piero.

All the Florentine guilds, major and minor, were abolished in 1770, by the decree of Leopold II, Holy Roman Emperor (as Grand Duke of Tuscany), assigning their functions to the single Florentine Chamber of Commerce, Art and Manufacture (Camera di Commercio, Arti e Manifatture), with the exception of the Arte dei Giudici e Notai (Judges & Notaries), which lingered on until it was finally abolished in 1777 by a new decree.

== See also ==
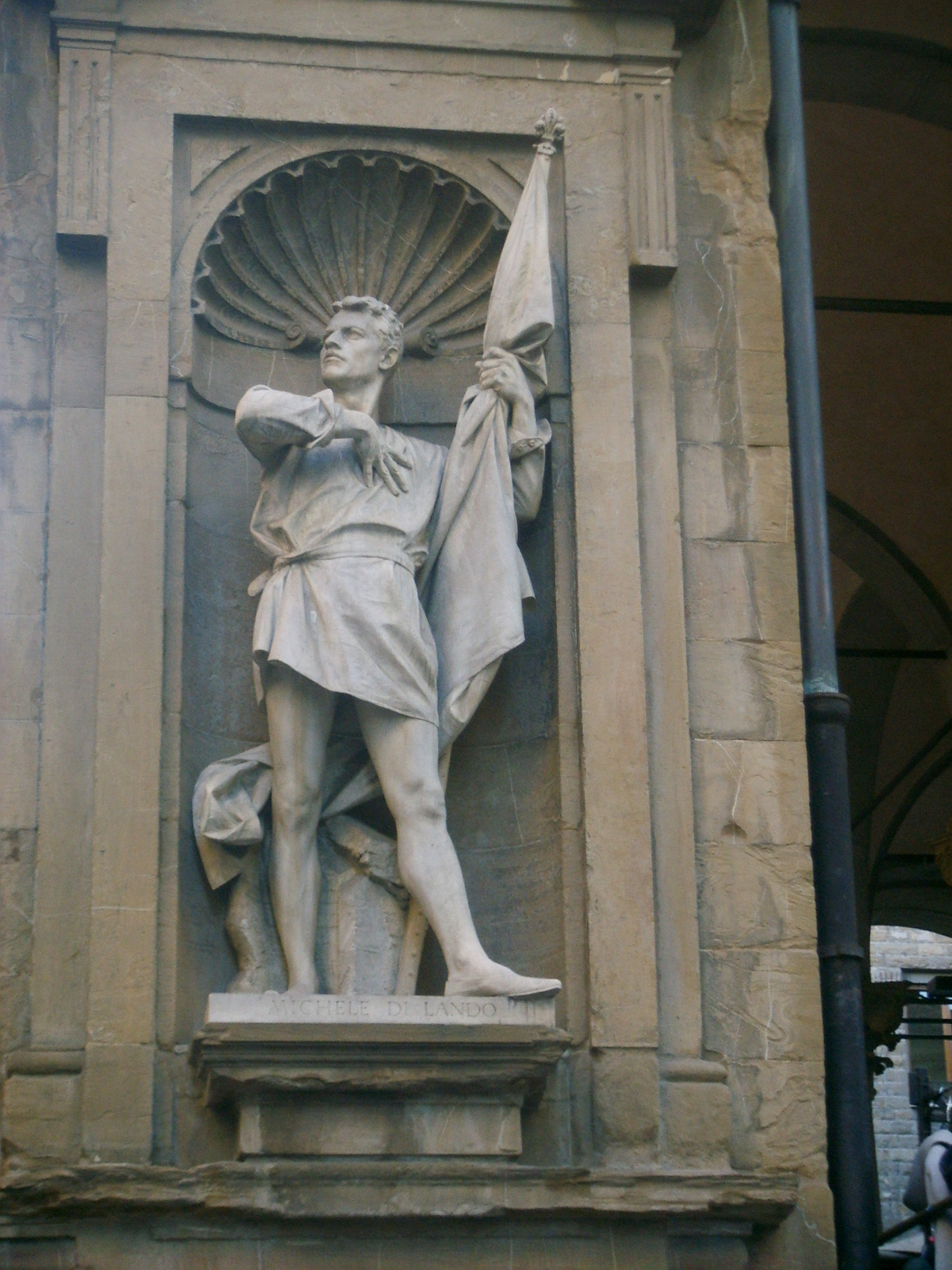
Statue of Michele di Lando, Loggia del Mercato Nuovo, Florence

- Ciompi, guild-less wool carders who revolted in 1378
- Masterpiece
