= War of the Eight =

War of the Eight may refer to:

- War of the Eight Princes (291–306), a series of civil wars among kings/princes of the Chinese Jin dynasty regarding the regency over the developmentally disabled Emperor Hui of Jin
- War of the Eight Saints (1375–1378), a war between Pope Gregory XI and a coalition of Italian city-states led by Florence, which contributed to the end of the Avignon Papacy
