= Eight of Santa Maria Novella =

The Eight of Santa Maria Novella were a radical group involved in the Ciompi Revolt in Florence in 1378.

== Formation ==
In 1378, revolt broke out in Florence. After the ciompi (wool carders) had taken the Palace of the Signoria, a new group of priors took control of the city, led by Michele di Lando. Although this leadership did carry out a number of radical reforms including the formation of three new guilds to represent the poorer workers, many of the aristocracy and the wool workers remained dissatisfied, particularly those from south of the Arno. They therefore went to the Palace of the Signoria once again to challenge the new government. The protesters were told to leave and give up their weapons and in return, the priors would legislate to meet their demands. The protesters left but afterwards, they feared that they had been tricked so they gathered in large numbers and selected the Eight of Santa Maria Novella to hold the priors accountable. The Eight were drawn from the lowest tiers of society and set up their base in a Dominican priory.

== Actions ==
The Eight partially took control of the government of Florence and began making the decisions of state. Their power grew as they had a lot of popular support and gained recognition from both the workers and some of the elites. To consolidate their power, the Eight sent a group of messengers to the priors to demand that they recognise their decrees. Whilst some of the priors were willing to do so, Michele di Lando, the standard bearer of justice, refused to do so and attacked the messengers. Street fighting followed and the priors and guildsmen were able to defeat the followers of the Eight.

== Aftermath ==
Having routed the followers of the Eight, the priors disbanded one of the three new guilds that represented the lowest workers and the apprentices. Further, a couple of the priors who were drawn from the lowest tiers of society were removed and replaced. The other new guilds remained in place. However in 1382, aristocratic power was restored in Florence and the power of the new guilds went into decline.
