= Arte di Calimala =

Guild of arts and crafts of Florence

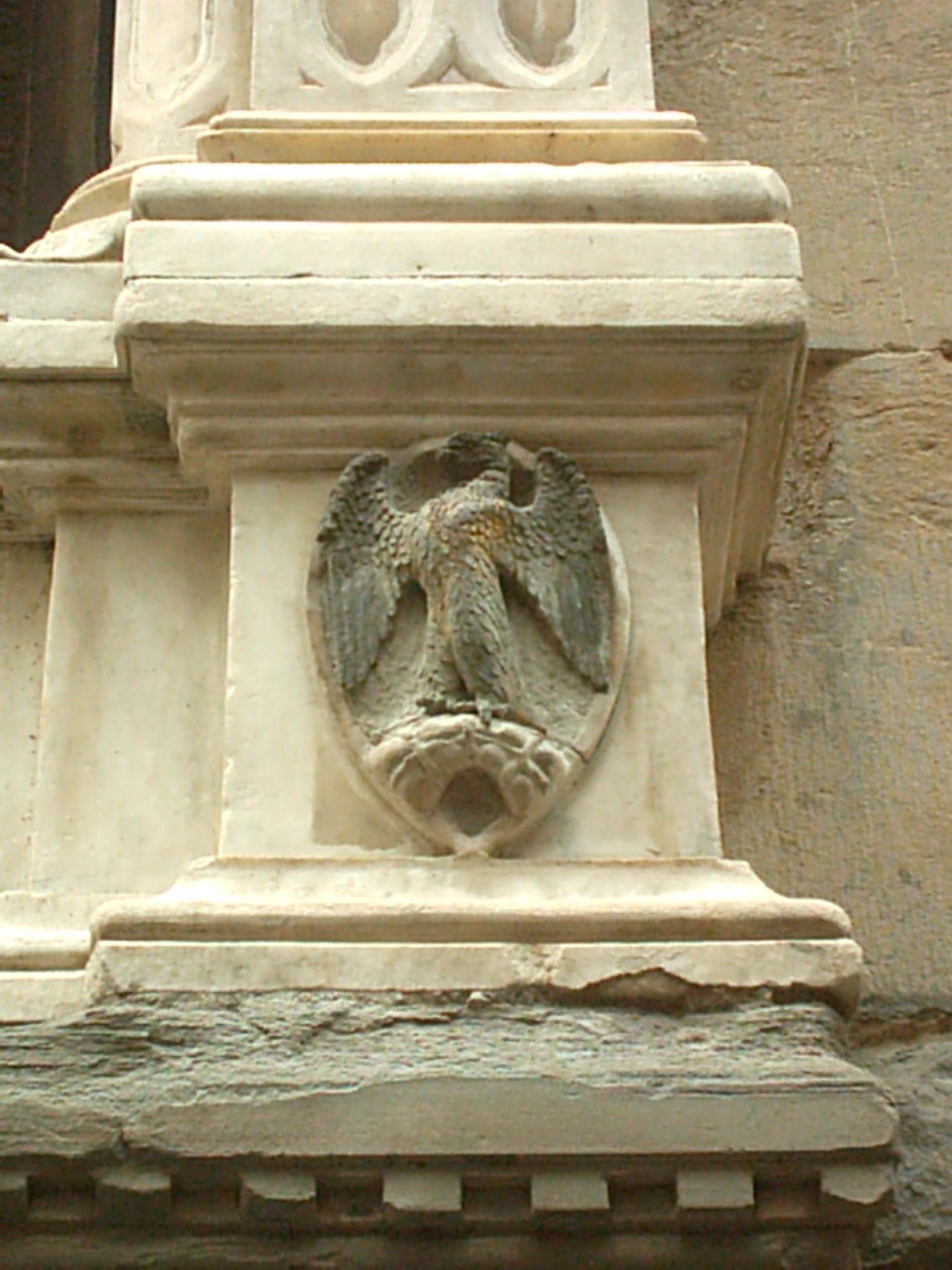
The eagle on a bolt of cloth, symbol of the Arte di Calimala

The Arte di Calimala, the guild of the cloth finishers and merchants in foreign cloth, was one of the greater guilds of Florence, the Arti Maggiori, who arrogated to themselves the civic power of the Republic of Florence during the Late Middle Ages. The ascendancy of the Calimala ran from the organization of Florentine guilds, each with its gonfaloniere in the thirteenth century, until the rise of the Medici usurped all other communal powers in the fifteenth century. Their presence is commemorated in the via di Calimala, leading away from the city's Roman forum (now Piazza della Repubblica) through the Mercato Nuovo to the former city gate, the Por Santa Maria, as the Roman cardo; the main street, as old as Florence itself, was a prime location for trade, even though, unpaved, crowded, and much narrower than its present state, it was truly a callis malis, an "ill passage-way". The name Calimala is of great antiquity and obscure etymology. Though the original earliest archives of the Arte di Calimala were lost in an 18th-century fire, abundant copies, preserved at the Archivio di Stato, Florence, document the guild's statutes and its activities.

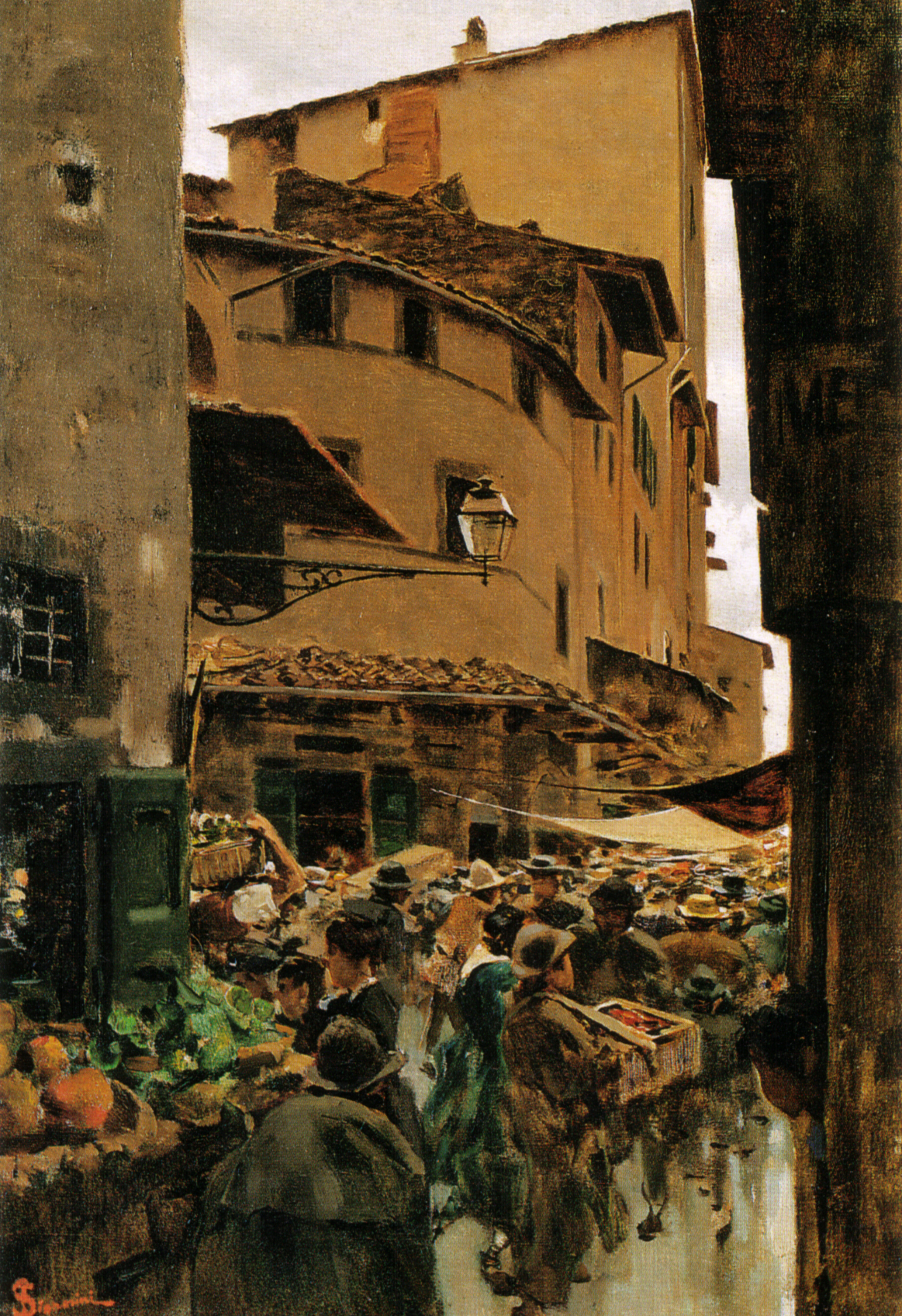
Via Calimala painted by Telemaco Signorini, 1889

== Cloth Trade ==
The merchants of the Arte di Calimala imported woollen cloth from northern France, from Flanders and Brabant, which was dyed, stretched, fulled, calendared and finished in Florence. Weaving was strictly the province of the Arte della Lana, who imported raw wool from England, but who, for their part, might dye but not otherwise finish any already-woven cloth.

The woollen cloth trade was the engine that drove the city's economy. With the profits from the cloth trade, closely monitored by the Arte di Calimala itself, and usually constrained within the limitations on usury laid down by the Church, true capitalism emerged in Florence by the thirteenth century. A small, not particularly outstanding 14th-century consortium or compagnia, that of Francesco del Bene and company, whose archives happen to have survived, was studied by Armando Sapori. Francesco had two inactive partners, a bookkeeper and eight or ten factors, and handled about a bolt of cloth a day. On a larger scale, the compagnia of the merchant-bankers of the Scali family has also been examined, by Silvano Borsari. Scali interests extending to England, the source of the wool, led by degrees to their bankruptcy in 1326 in a liquidity crisis. The permissible profit over the primo costo, the asking price for cloth in the North, to which the added costs of God's penny, the maltolts owed the king of France, transportation to Paris, the center of the dyeing industry, warehousing, and gifts, tips and bribes along the way, resulted in the vero costo, the "real cost", both of which are alluded to in the Calimala statutes. A profit of 10 to 12 per cent was allowed, representing the "just price" that exercised the Church.

To be able to ensure proper measurement of the cloths they had three standard iron rods, mounted in different parts of the city, and members were obliged to measure annually their rod against the official so-called canna.

== History of Guild ==
The earliest documentation of the Arte di Calimala dates circa 1182, in which the Florentine cloth traders were among the first to band together in a confraternity to control the trade that was their livelihood.

=== Guild Members ===
Members of the Calimala were the elite of Florence: the families of the Bardi, Cerchi, Pazzi, Peruzzi, Mozzi, Pulci, Canigiani and Spini. Only after the 1348 plague they allowed new members to join. The capital required and the credit network that activated it, meant that members of the Calimala like the Scali turned naturally to banking to complement their activities as merchants, who might turn a profit in grain or in real estate holdings, or, like the Scali in 1326, might face bankruptcy proceedings in the merchants' court of the Mercanzia. The example of the Scali shows the long range of activities of the Arte di Calimala: the Scali were active in the 1220s in England, source of the wool that was woven in Flanders and Brabant; during the reign of Henry III they served as the principal financial intermediary between the King and the papal curia; thus after the battle of Montaperti (1260) the Scali were loyal Guelph adherents of the papal cause in Italy, until their prosperity was curtailed, as Pope Boniface VIII turned to other bankers of Florence and Pistoia, and the Ricciardi of Lucca became preferred bankers in England. With better fortunes in the early fourteenth century, the Scali were procuring wool in England and Burgundy, were active in France and Germany, with factors in Perugia, Milan and Venice, and exported grain from Apulia to Ragusa across the Adriatic, until a liquidity crisis brought them before the Mercanzia and briefly shook Florentine credit abroad.

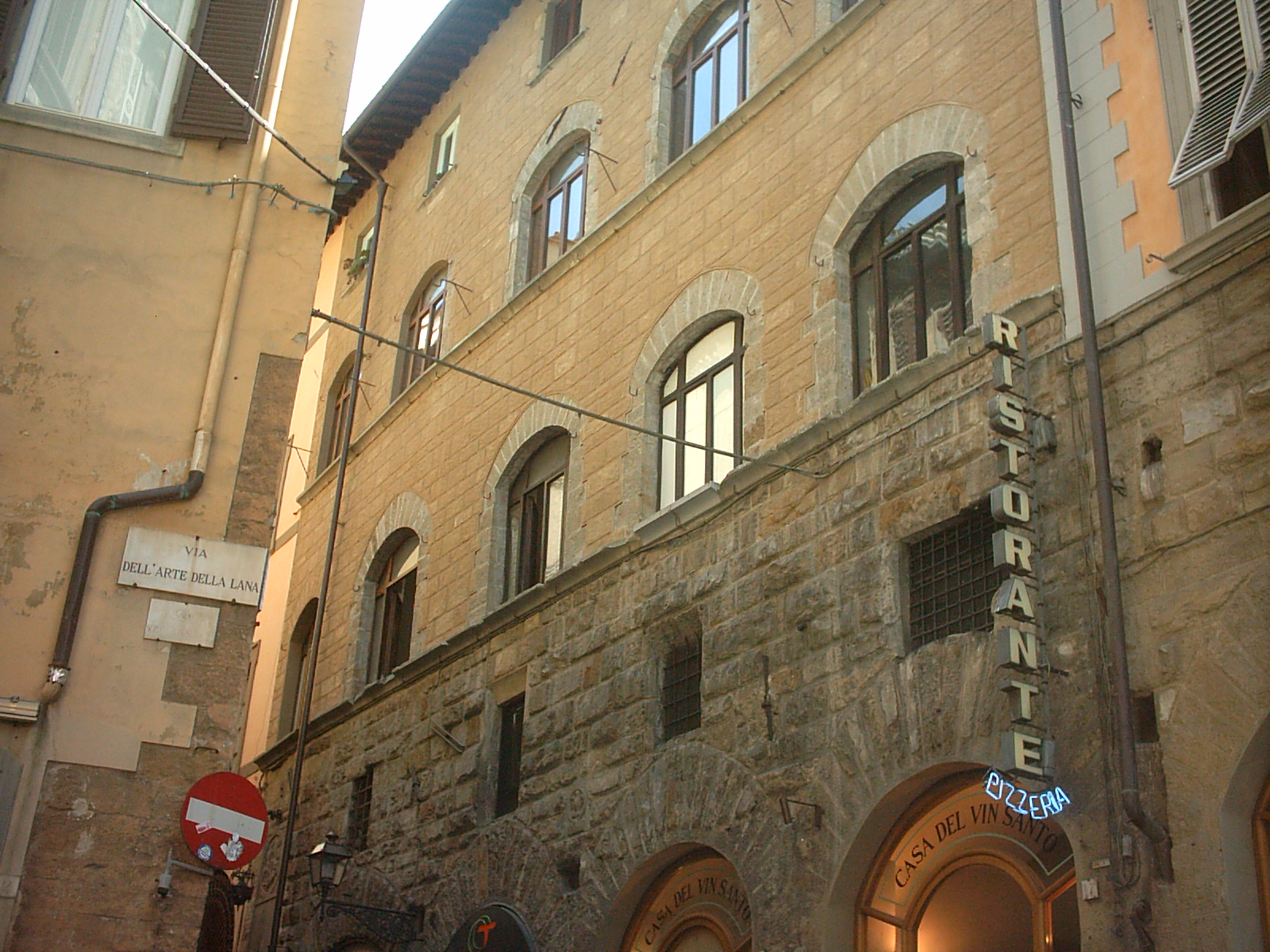
The late-14th century Palazzo dell'Arte di Calimala on via Calimaruzza, seat of the guild

=== Constitution and patronage ===
Until 1237 the meeting place of the Arte di Calimala was in the ground floor of one of the tower houses of the Cavalcanti facing the Mercato Nuovo. Then at the end of the century a new palazzo was built in via Calimaruzza. The facade still bears the guild's insignia of the gilded eagle. Here the guild members met weekly to discuss and regulate their closely guarded and exclusive activities, placing all business contention before the council, with the resoundingly Roman name of the Collegio dei Consoli. The Consoli were required to be at least thirty years of age, to be Florentine by birth, needless to say, and to subscribe, in the civic politics, to the Guelph partisans. The guild supported its members, backed their credit in the city and abroad, provided an annuity to aged members and those of long standing, and cared for their widows and children.

At its own expense the corporation maintained an armed night guard protecting the shops and warehouses, and interceded with innkeepers for the lodging of their foreign clients, a service that kept these stranieri under the Calimala's watchful eye.

The Consuls of the Arte di Calimala were entrusted with maintaining the Baptistery of San Giovanni by the mid-twelfth century, according to Giovanni Villani; thus it was the Calimali that commissioned from Lorenzo Ghiberti the gilded bronze doors called the "Gates of Paradise" and the bronze statue of their patron, John the Baptist, for a niche at Orsanmichele. The Calimala held also the patronage over San Miniato al Monte and several hospitals.

=== Demise ===
The Arte di Calimala, for generations reduced to little more than a confraternity, was finally suppressed in 1770 by the enlightened despot Pietro Leopoldo, Grand Duke of Tuscany, who instituted in its stead a modern chamber of commerce, the Camera di Comercio, which lay more directly under his guidance.
