= Ubaldini =

Ubaldini is an Italian surname. Notable people with the surname include:

- Domenico di Bartolommeo Ubaldini or Domenico Puligo (1492–1527), Italian painter of the Florentine Renaissance
- Federigo Ubaldini (1610–1657) Italian Dante and Petrarch scholar, and secretary to papal consitory
- Migliorino Ubaldini (active 1548), Italian military engineer working in Scotland
- Ottaviano or Attaviano degli Ubaldini (1214–1273), Italian cardinal
- Petruccio Ubaldini (1524–1600), Italian calligraphist and illuminator on vellum who worked in England
- Roberto Ubaldini (1581–1635), bishop and cardinal of the Catholic Church
- Ruggieri degli Ubaldini (active 1271–1295), Italian archbishop, mentioned in Dante's Inferno
- Saúl Ubaldini (1936–2006), Argentine labor leader and parliamentarian for the Peronist Justicialist Party
