= Federigo Ubaldini =

Italian scholar (1610–1657)

Federigo Ubaldini (1610 - 1657) was an Italian Dante and Petrarch scholar, born in Siena.

He was secretary to Cardinal Francesco Barberini, and later secretary to the papal consistory in Rome.

He published a biography of Angelo Colocci and various notes on the Renaissance poets.

He also created annotations about the Divine Comedy. In 1642, Federigo edited a publication of the work Il Tesoro by Brunetto Latini (c. 1220–1294), a guardian and teacher of Dante.
