= Loggia del Mercato Nuovo =

Building in Florence, Italy

Coordinates: 43°46′11.97″N 11°15′15.46″E

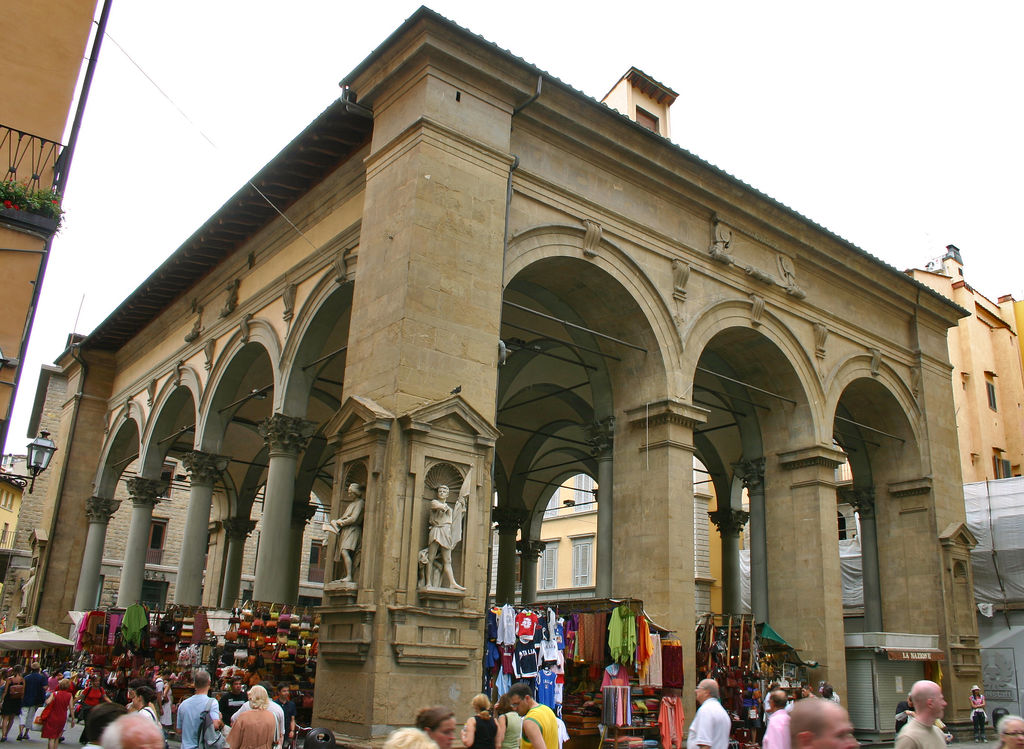
Loggia del Mercato Nuovo

The Loggia del Mercato Nuovo (Italian pronunciation: [ˈlɔddʒa del merˈkaːto ˈnwɔːvo]; "Loggia of the New Market"), popularly known as the Loggia del Porcellino (pronounced [ˈlɔddʒa del portʃelˈliːno]; "Loggia of the Piglet"), is a building in Florence, Italy. It is so called to distinguish it from the Mercato vecchio (pronounced [merˈkaːto ˈvɛkkjo]; "Old Market") that used to be located in the area of today's Piazza della Repubblica.

== History ==
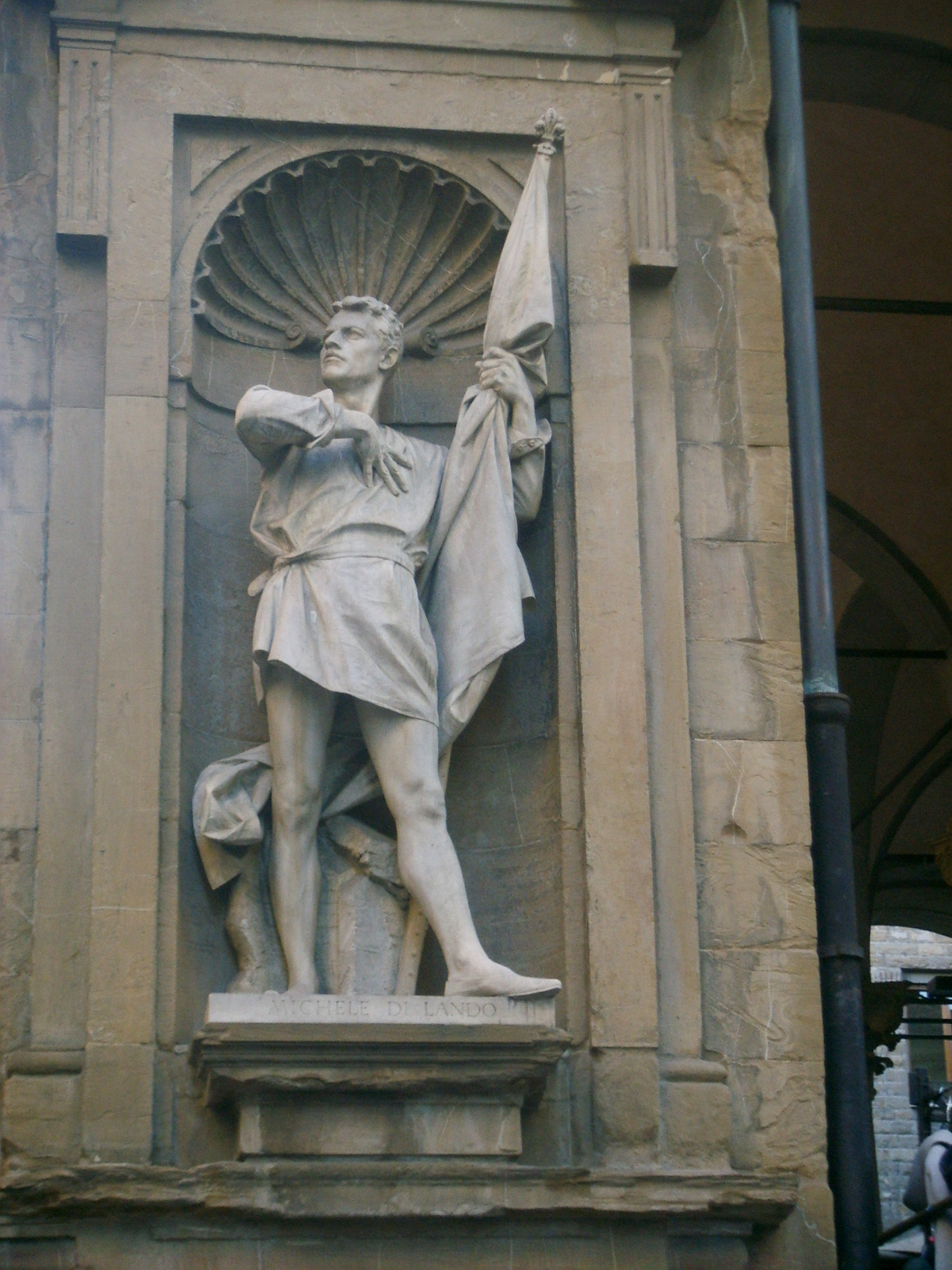
Statue of Michele di Lando, Loggia del Mercato Nuovo, Florence

The loggia was built around the middle of the 16th century in the heart of the city, just a few steps from the Ponte Vecchio. Initially, it was intended for the sale of silk and luxury goods and then for the famous straw hats, but today mainly leather goods and souvenirs are sold.

In the corner niches statues of famous Florentines were intended to be placed, but only three were made at the end of the 19th century: Michele di Lando by Ippazio Antonio Bortone, Giovanni Villani by Gaetano Trentanove, and Bernardo Cennini by Emilio Mancini.

The focal point of the loggia is the Fontana del Porcellino (IPA: [fonˈtaːna del portʃelˈliːno]; "Fountain of the Piglet"), actually a copy of a bronze wild boar by Pietro Tacca from the sixteenth century marble. In 2008 the Pietro Tacca's masterpiece was replaced with a modern copy cast by Ferdinando Marinelli Artistic Foundry in 1998. The original marble of the Porcellino can be found at Museo Bardini. Popular tradition has it that rubbing the nose brings fortune, so over time, the statue has acquired a certain shine in that spot. Visitors are encouraged to place a coin in the mouth of the boar after rubbing its nose, and superstition implies that the wish will be granted if the offering tumbles through the grate whence the water flows. The slope of the grate is such that most coins do fall through, and are collected by the city. There is a copy of the Porcellino outside Sydney Hospital and passers-by drop coins and rub its nose in the same way.

== Pietra dello scandalo ==
Another oddity of the place is the so-called pietra dello scandalo (IPA: [ˈpjɛːtra dello ˈskandalo]; "Stone of Shame"), a round spot marked in bicoloured marble at the centre of the loggia, which is only visible when no sales stalls are there. The design reproduces one of the wheels of a medieval carroccio, symbol of the Florentine Republic, on which the city's standard was hoisted daily. The Carroccio was placed on this spot and Florentine troops met around it before every battle.

The spot was later chosen for another purpose, whence its alternative name pietra dell'acculata (IPA: [ˈpjɛːtra dellakkuˈlaːta]; approximately "Stone of the Bum Punishment"). During the Renaissance, the punishment of insolvent debtors included being chained to a post on this spot and then paddled repeatedly on the naked buttocks. The popular expression stare col culo a terra ("to have one's ass on the ground") and the word sculo (a dialectal word for "misfortune") may have originated from this practice.

== Other images ==
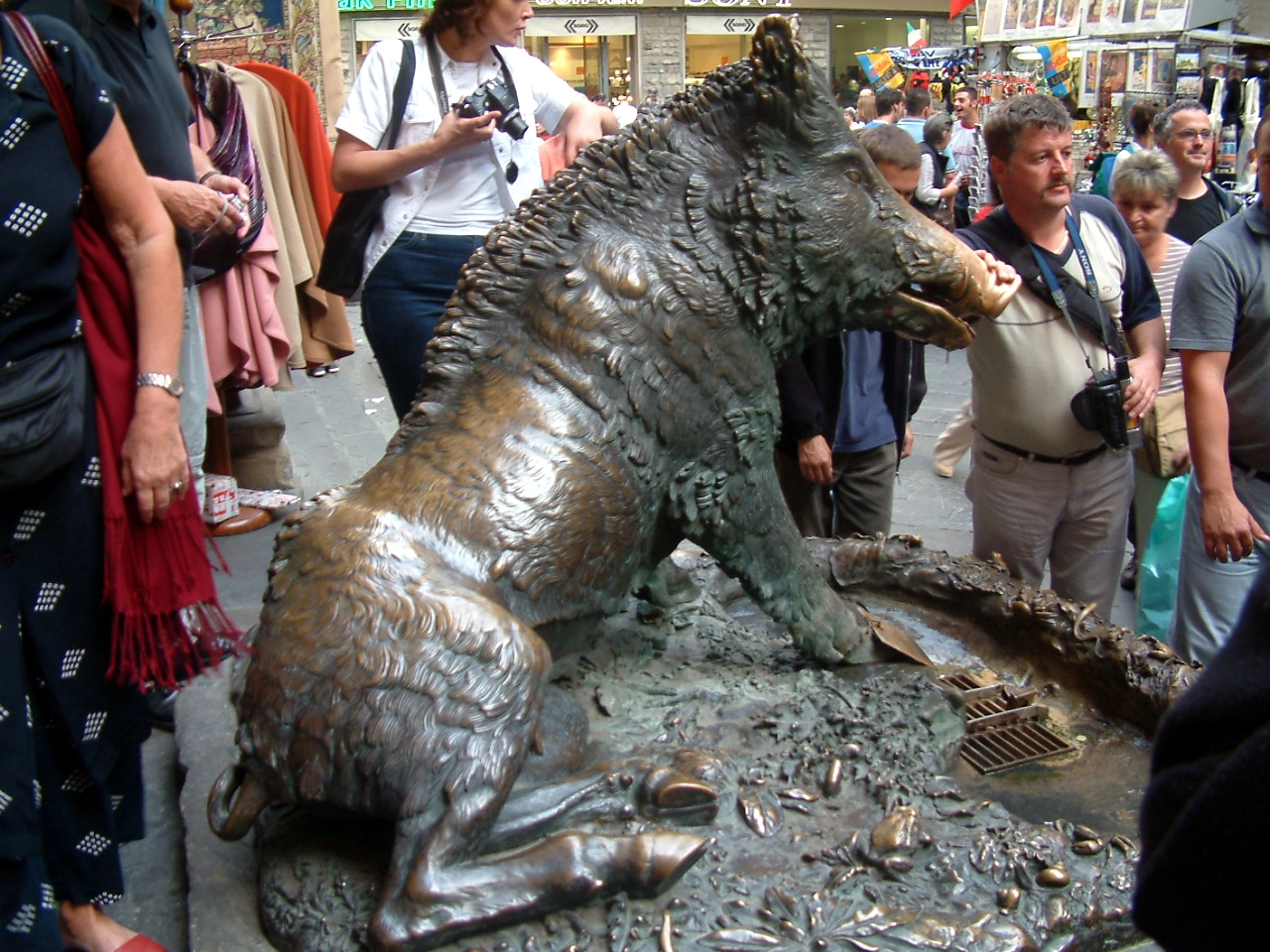
The bronze of the Porcellino.

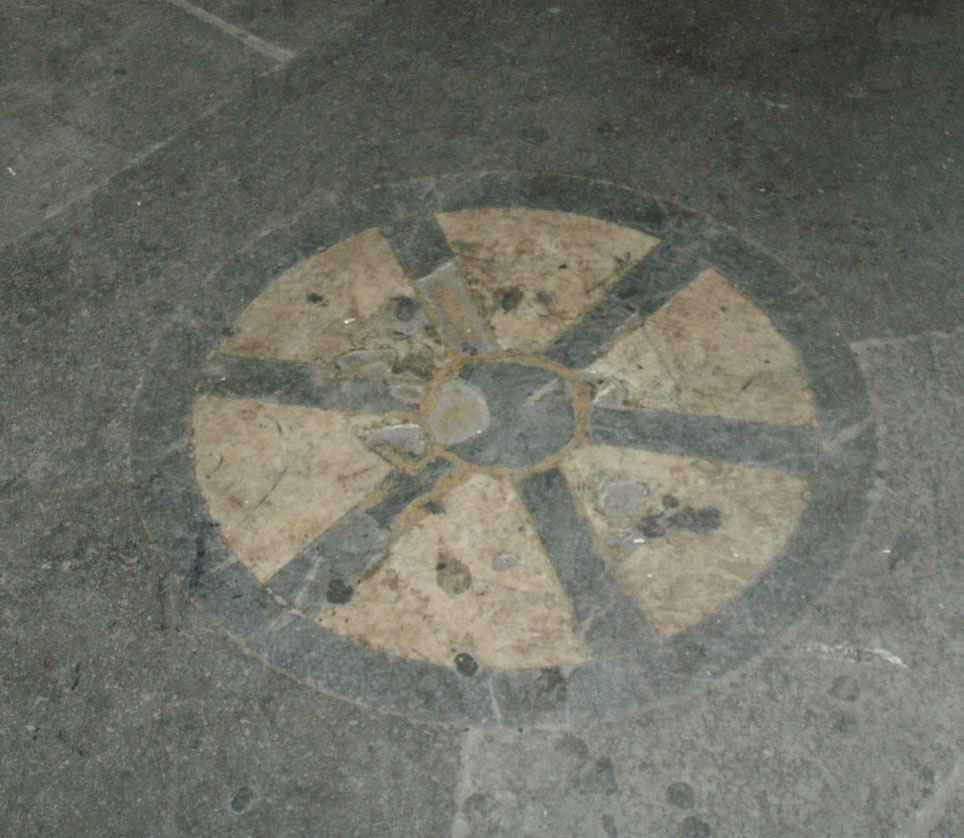
The pietra dello scandalo.

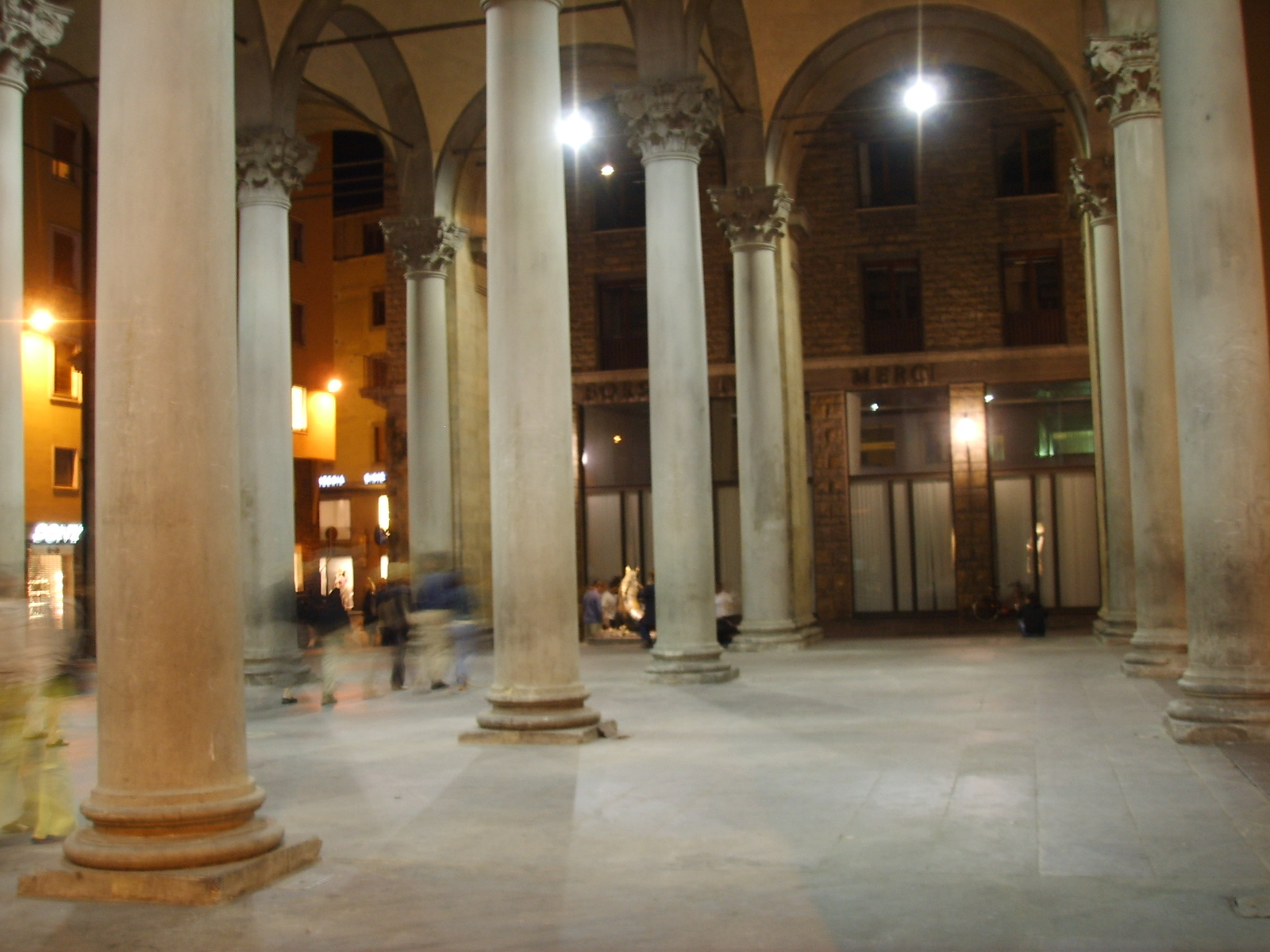
Night view, without sales stalls.

== See also ==
- Arcade (architecture)
- Mercato Centrale (Firenze)
- Marketplace
- Merchant
- Retail
