= Signoria of Florence =

Government of Medieval and Renaissance Florence

The Signoria of Florence (Italian for "lordship") was the government of the medieval and Renaissance Republic of Florence, between 1250 and 1532. Its nine members, the Priori, were chosen from the ranks of the guilds of the city: six of them from the major guilds, and two from the minor guilds. The ninth became the Gonfaloniere of Justice.

== Selection of members ==
The names of all guild members over thirty years old were put in eight leather bags called borse. Every two months, these bags were taken from the church of Santa Croce, where they were ordinarily kept, and in a short ceremony drawn out at random. Only men who were not in debt, had not served a recent term, and had no relation to the names of men already drawn, would be considered eligible for office.

== Service in the Signoria ==
Immediately after they were elected, the nine were expected to move into the Palazzo della Signoria, where they would remain for the two months of their office. There they were paid a modest sum to cover their expenses and were provided with green-liveried servants. The Priori had a uniform of crimson coats, lined with ermine and with ermine collars and cuffs.

In undertaking their governmental duties, the Signoria was required to consult two other elected councils collectively known as Collegi. The first was the Dodici Buonomini, with twelve members, while the second, the Sedici Gonfalonieri, consisted of sixteen people. Other councils, such as the Ten of War, the Eight of Security and the Six of Commerce, were elected as the need arose.

== See also ==
- Boule (ancient Greece)
- History of Florence
- History of Italy
  - Medieval Italy
  - Italian Renaissance
- Italian city-states
- Maritime republics
- Sortition
