= Michele di Lando =

Michele di Lando was the first leader of the Ciompi Revolt in Florence that started in 1378.

== Background ==
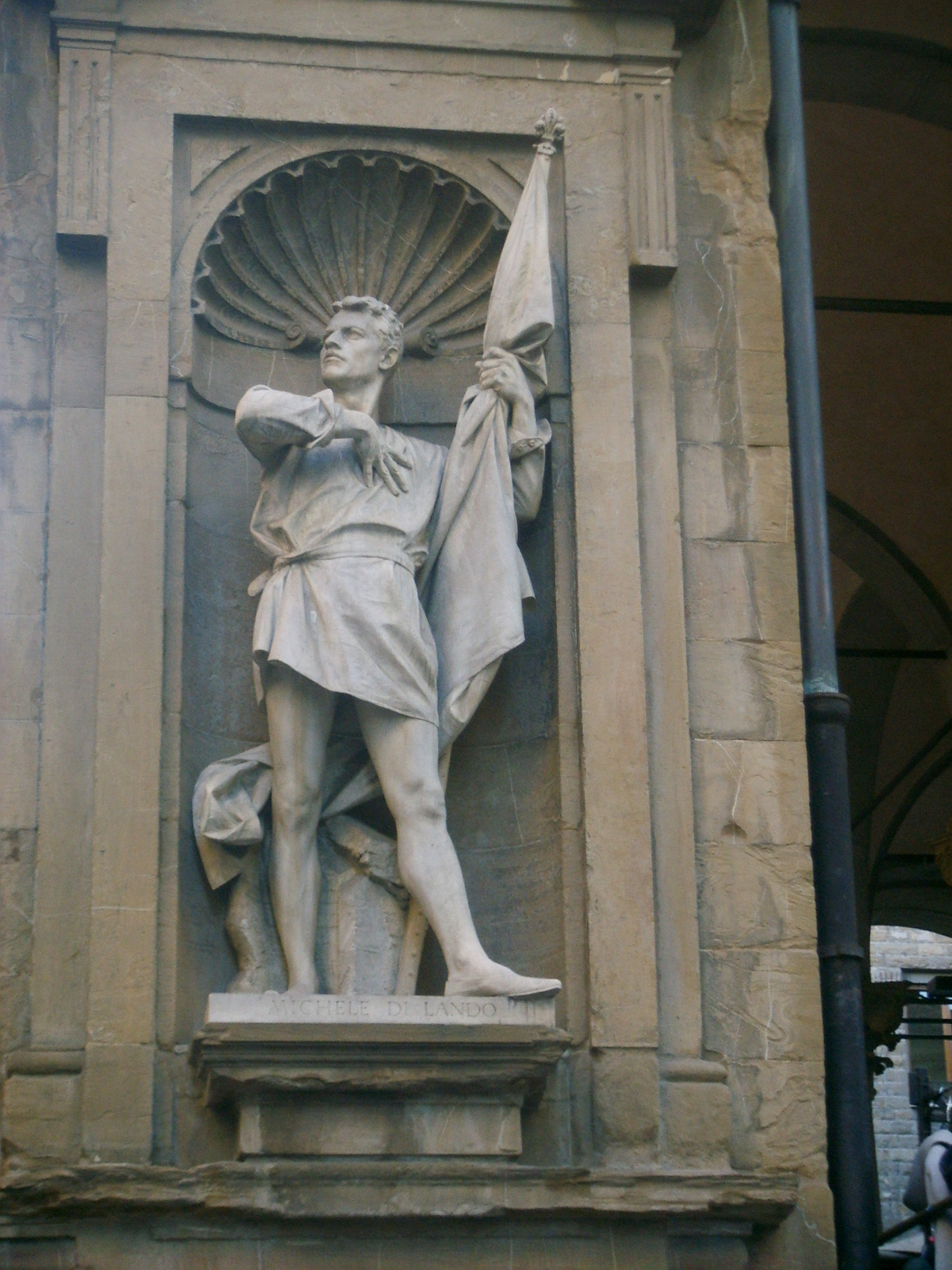
Statue of Michele di Lando by Ippazio Antonio Bortone, Loggia del Mercato Nuovo, Florence

Michele di Lando was the son of a woman named Simona who was a vegetable seller in Florence. Michele himself was a wool carder.

== Role in the Ciompi Revolt ==
There was much discontent in Florence in 1378. Salvestro de' Medici was challenging the authority of the Guelphs and facing heavy resistance from the nobility. Moreover, many workers in Florence remained without a guild to represent them and were therefore entirely disenfranchised. On 22 July 1378, violence broke out in Florence once again. Michele di Lando went to the Piazza of the Signoria where he was given a banner of justice with which to lead the people. He ordered that the Palace of the Signoria should be taken and the governors chose to flee. Michele took power and for six weeks, he fought to restore stability. His government had three new guilds created so that almost all men gained representation.

However the radicals were not happy with the new government for many of the old structures of government remained so they selected the Eight of Santa Maria Novella to represent them instead. This led to a conflict between the Priors led by Michele and the Eight. Michele was able to defeat the radicals and so returned to power. As a result of the revolt, he had the guild representing the lowest workers and the apprentices disbanded but left the others intact.
