= Arte della Lana =

Medieval Florentine wool guild

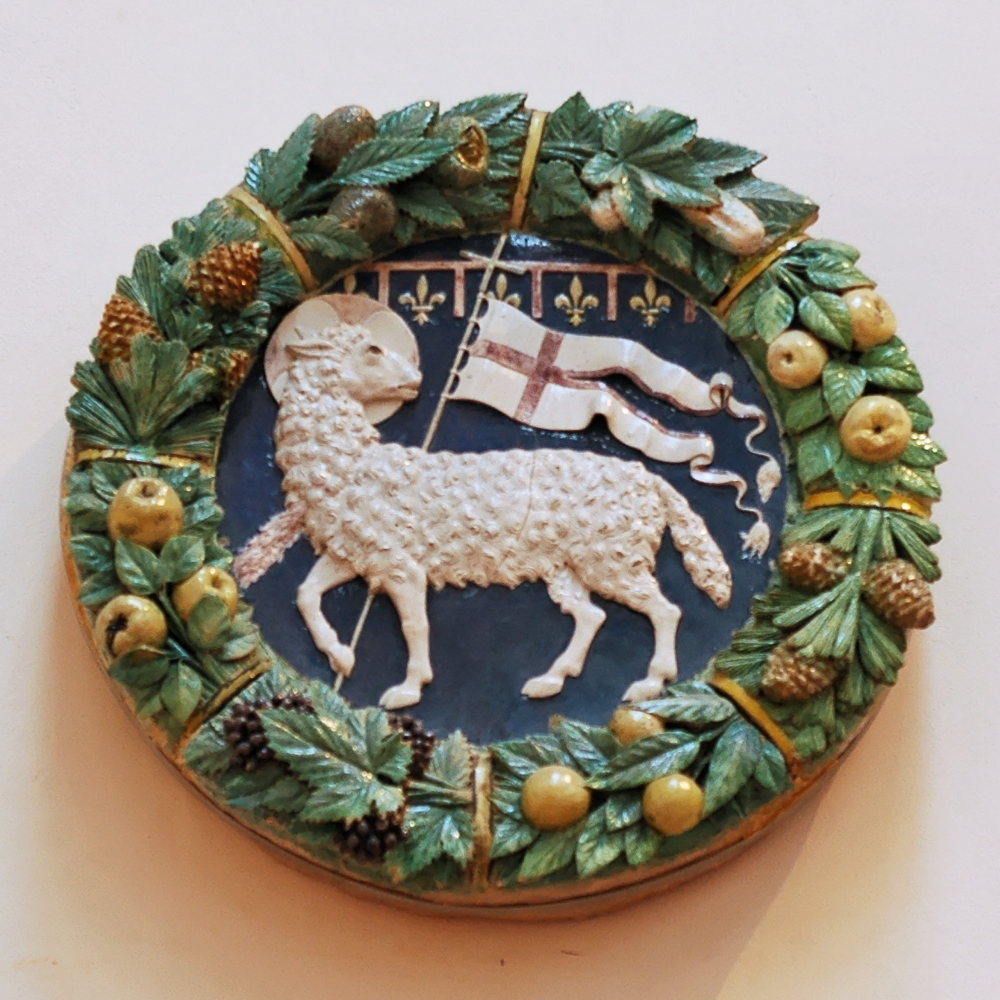
Coat of arms of the Arte della Lana, Andrea della Robbia, 1487, Museo dell'Opera del Duomo in Florence.

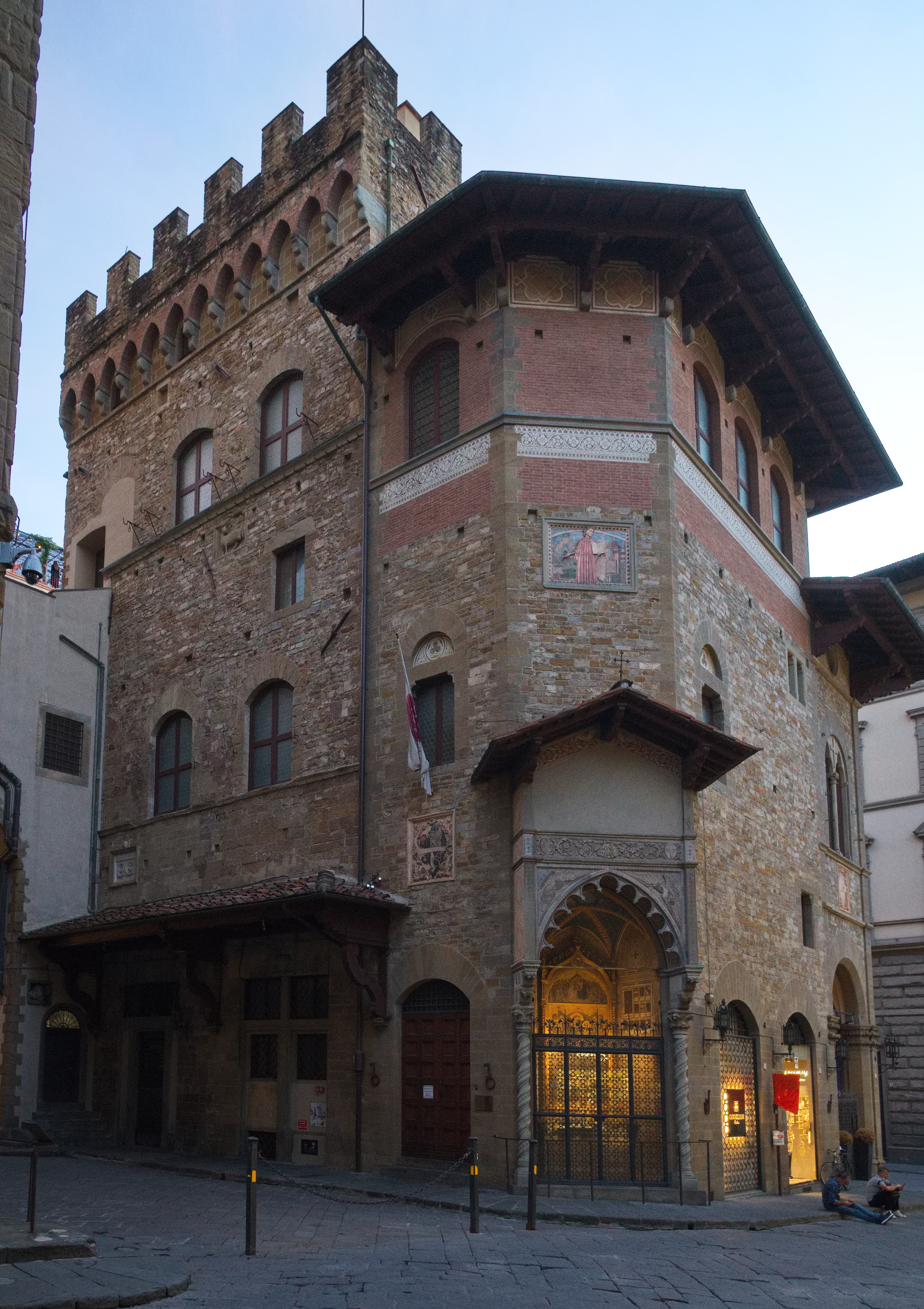
Palazzo of the Arte della Lana next to Orsanmichele

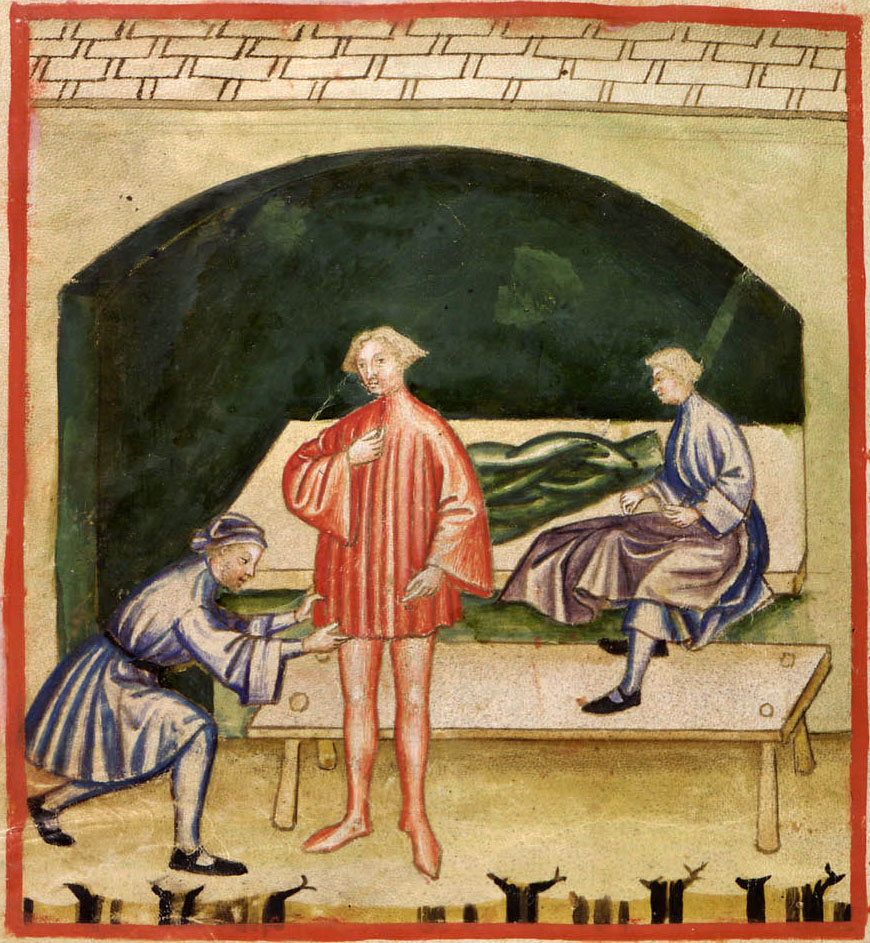
Miniature of a wool clothing shop from Biblioteca Casanatense

The Arte della Lana was the wool guild of Florence during the Late Middle Ages and in the Renaissance. It was one of the seven Arti Maggiori ("greater trades") of Florence, separate from the Arti Minori (the "lesser trades") and the Arti Mediane (the "middle trades"). The Arte della Lana dealt in woollen cloth and cooperated with the other corporations of bankers and merchants in administering the commune, both under the podestà and the Republic of Florence. The powerful Albizzi family were prominent members of the guild.

== History ==
At the height of the industry the Arte della Lana directly employed 30,000 workers and indirectly about a third of Florence's population, and produced 100,000 lengths of cloth annually. The Arte della Lana saw all the processes from the raw baled wool through the final cloth, woven at numerous looms scattered in domiciles throughout the city. Like other guilds, the Arte served only to coordinate the activities of its own members, who did not generally own the means of production or directly manage the processes. Its syndics ensured that quality standards were met and contracts were honored.

The predecessor and, until the mid-14th century the rival of the Arte della Lana, was the powerful Arte di Calimala, a corporation of importers of raw cloth, who dyed and finished it.

The guildhall, the Palazzo dell’ Arte della Lana, was completed in 1308, with an attached fortifiable tower-house. From its interior, where some 14th-century frescoes remain, a gallery designed by Bernardo Buontalenti links the palazzo with the church of Orsanmichele. The palazzo is now the seat of the Società Dantesca. The wool guild was also located in Florence, Italy, and commissioned Michelangelo to sculpt the statue David.

== Patronage ==
The Arte della Lana exercised its patronage over the Opera del Duomo, entrusted to it directly by the Signoria in 1331. The patron saint chosen by the guild was Santo Stefano. The guild commissioned a statue of the saint from Lorenzo Ghiberti (1427–1428) placed in the tabernacle on the facade of Orsanmichele (today a copy).

== The Palazzo ==
The original building intended as the residence of the Arte della Lana was erected in 1308, as attested by two Latin inscriptions on the fronts of the current building, incorporating an older tower of the Compiobbesi family, partly burnt down in 1284, after the expulsion of the family since they were Ghibellines. In the following centuries, further rooms were built to expand the headquarters, due to the considerable public activity of the Arte.

To allow easier access to the upper floors of the church of Orsanmichele, intended to house the new General Archive of private contracts and wills, Cosimo I de' Medici decreed in 1569 the construction of a staircase with access from via Calimala which, following the side of the residence with a further leaning body, determined an aerial connection between the two buildings on via dell'Arte della Lana. The project was realized by Bernardo Buontalenti.

After the suppression of the guild in 1770, the building was already transformed into a tenement, and became a rectory of the church of Orsanmichele from 1772 on.

Purchased in 1890 by the Municipality of Florence, it escaped the demolitions of the Renovation despite being deeply compromised, and was sold in 1903 to the Dante Alighieri Society for public readings as an illustration of the Divine Comedy. This promoted a complex restoration and reconstruction of the property, now isolated following the rehabilitation of the Mercato Vecchio area (1885-1895), in order to transform the ancient Compiobbesi tower into an architecture adhering to the idea that one had then of fourteenth-century Florence. Having examined various projects (among which the one in numerous and beautiful tables by the architect Cesare Spighi is kept in the Historical Archive of the Municipality) the works were then implemented in 1905 by the architect Enrico Lusini, who in any case had the merit (compared to other hypothesis) of leaving the door designed by Bernardo Buontalenti to the right of the main front of the building, albeit demolishing the sixteenth-century staircase and building a new one on the other side of the building, as well as giving "gloss and dignity to a building which previously was only called the keep".

== Other references ==
- "Medieval Sourcebook: The Arte della Lana & The Government of Florence, 1224". Internet History Sourcebooks Project.
