= Stinche Prison =

Former prison in Florence, Italy

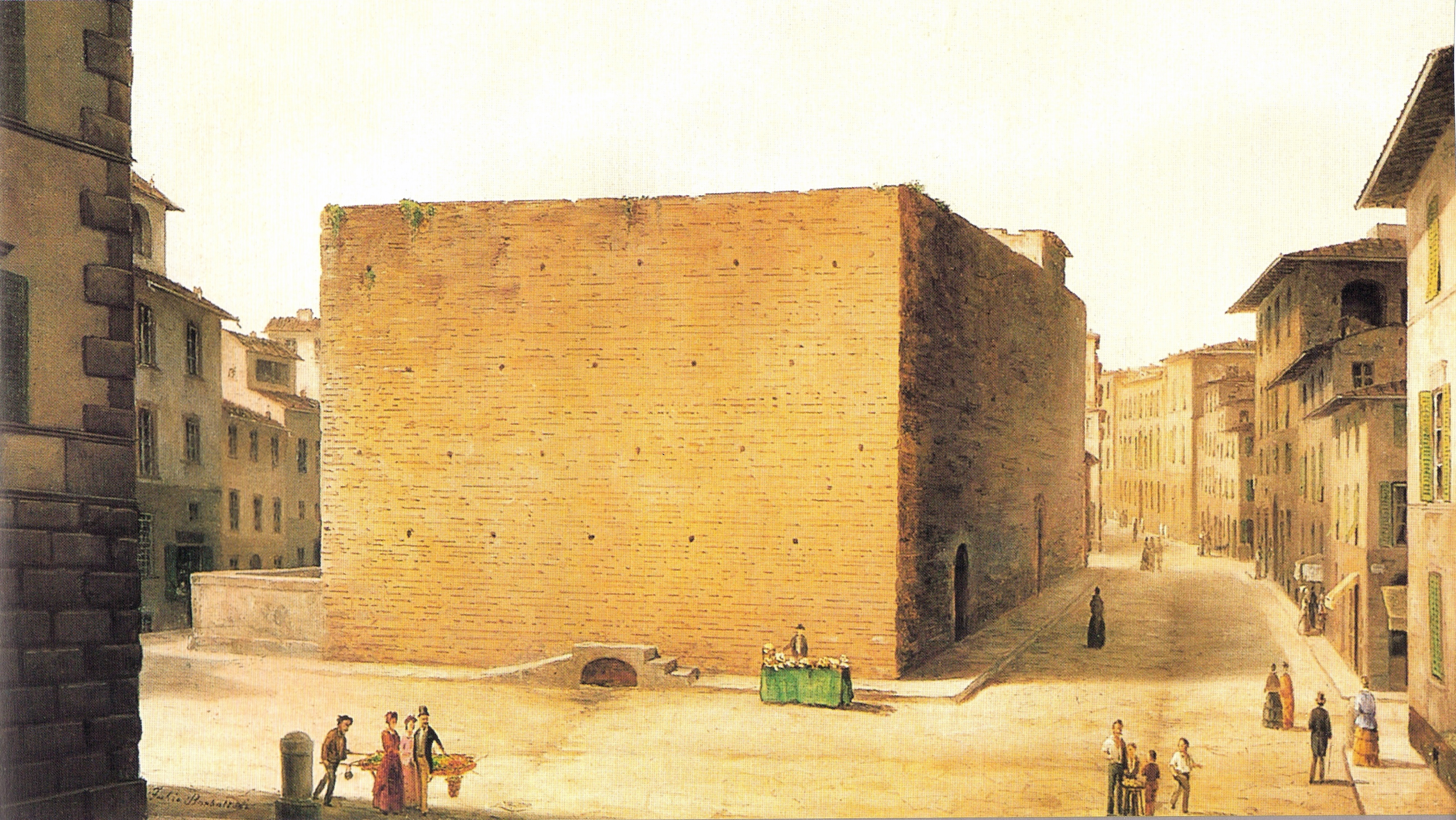
The Stinche prison by Fabio Borbottoni (1820-1902)

The Stinche Prison (Italian: carcere delle Stinche) was a prison on Via Ghibellina in the city of Florence, Italy. It stood more or less on the site now occupied by the Teatro Verdi.

== History ==
The earliest mention of a prison in Florence refers to the Burellæ, the vaults under the ruins of the city's ancient Roman amphitheatre and theatre, which remained visible for most of the medieval period. Next the city built or adapted towers as prisons, such as the torre della Pagliazza. People were also imprisoned in the basement of the Palazzo del Capitano or the Bargello. A cramped but less spartan gaol known as the "Alberghetto" was sited in the Torre di Arnolfo of the Palazzo Vecchio - its 15th century inmates included Cosimo il Vecchio and Girolamo Savonarola. All these prisons were run by private individuals and inmates had to pay one 'libbra' a day to their gaoler to cover his expenses, meaning wealthier people could buy better treatment. The poor were very harshly treated and mainly had to cover their fees from alms - there were periodic amnesties on particular holidays and religious festivals, but these only released a very limited number of prisoners and did not include murderers, political prisoners and those who had committed other serious crimes.

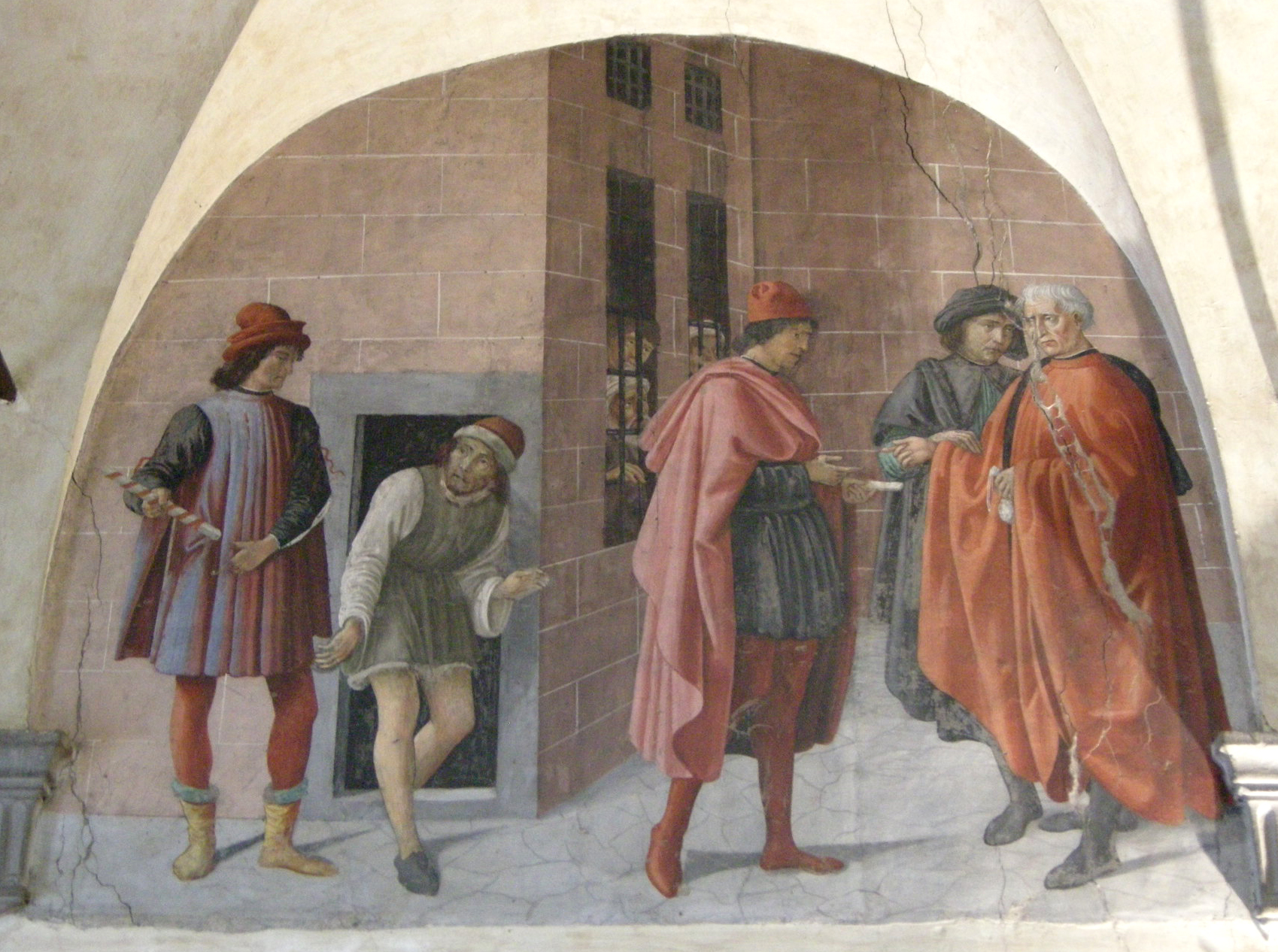
Lunette in the oratorio dei Buonomini di San Martino showing people visiting those in gaol, which was one of the seven works of mercy. The painting probably shows the Stinche prison, which was near the oratory.

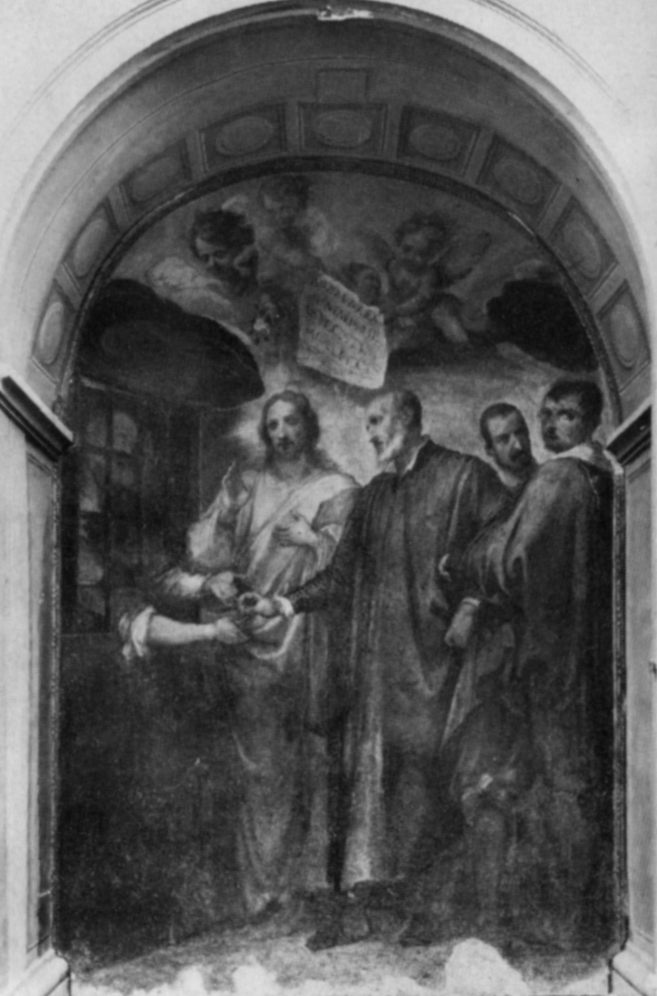
The 'Tabernacolo delle Stinche'

The Stinche complex was built from 1299 onwards by the Florentine Republic, using many stones from towers and houses owned by the Ghibelline Uberti family, which had been demolished after that family was driven out of the city following the Battle of Benevento. It was a square building surrounded by a moat and a very high 18-metre-long wall with no openings - this gave it its nickname of the "Isola delle Stinche" or "Stinche Island". The building itself had only one door, known as the "Porta della miseria" after its inscription Oportet misereri (it requires charity), referring to the fact that the prison was funded by private individuals not the state. The Buononimi di San Martino and a sub-company of the Compagnia di Santa Maria della Croce al Tempio known as the Buononimi delle Stinche gave charity to the prisoners. The Compagnia appointed four Buononimi delle Stinche to manage their donations and bequests so as to provide spiritual aid, money and food to the prisoners, especially the poorer ones who could not afford to bribe the guards for better treatment. They gained so much authority that they were granted the right to free debtors on the condition that the Buononimi became their guarantors and oversaw whether or not the debts were paid.

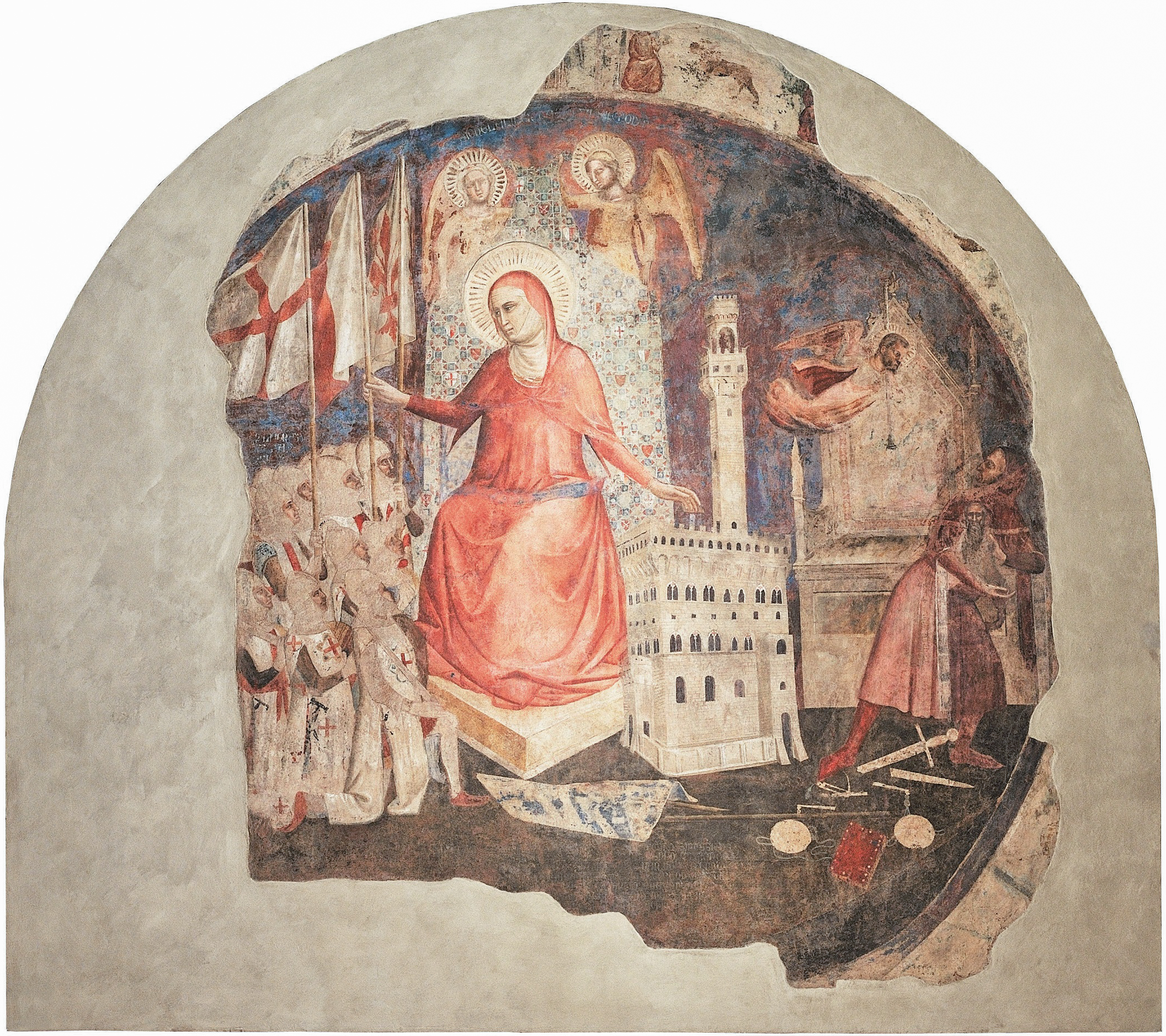
Andrea Orcagna, The Expulsion of the Duke of Athens, 1343 (detached fresco, Palazzo Vecchio)

In 1304 the prison's first inmates were Ghibellines taken in the capture of Stinche Castle, a Cavalcanti family stronghold near Greve in Chianti. The prison went on mainly to house prisoners of war and political prisoners. Most of Walter VI, Count of Brienne's political enemies were held there and the city's inhabitants stormed the prison. Orcagna was commissioned to paint a fresco of the event in the prison courtyard, entitled The Fall of the Duke of Athens, in which Saint Anne gives the Florentines the banners of the arts but an evil angel chases Walter from the city – the fresco is now detached and on display in the museum in Palazzo Vecchio. Prisoners were led along the via Ghibellina to the execution site near Torre della Zecca. Tabernacles were set up along the route to comfort the condemned prisoners, such as the Tabernacolo delle Stinche painted in 1616 by Giovanni da San Giovanni and remodelled in the 19th century by the architect Luigi de Cambray Digny. It may be that the Stinche was the subject of Sassetta's painting The Blessed Ranieri Rasini Delivering the Poor from the Prison in Florence. The building is very similar in appearance and it appears to be the same location. This painting had been a predella panel of the Polyptych of San Francesco de Borgo San Sepolcro (1437–1444).

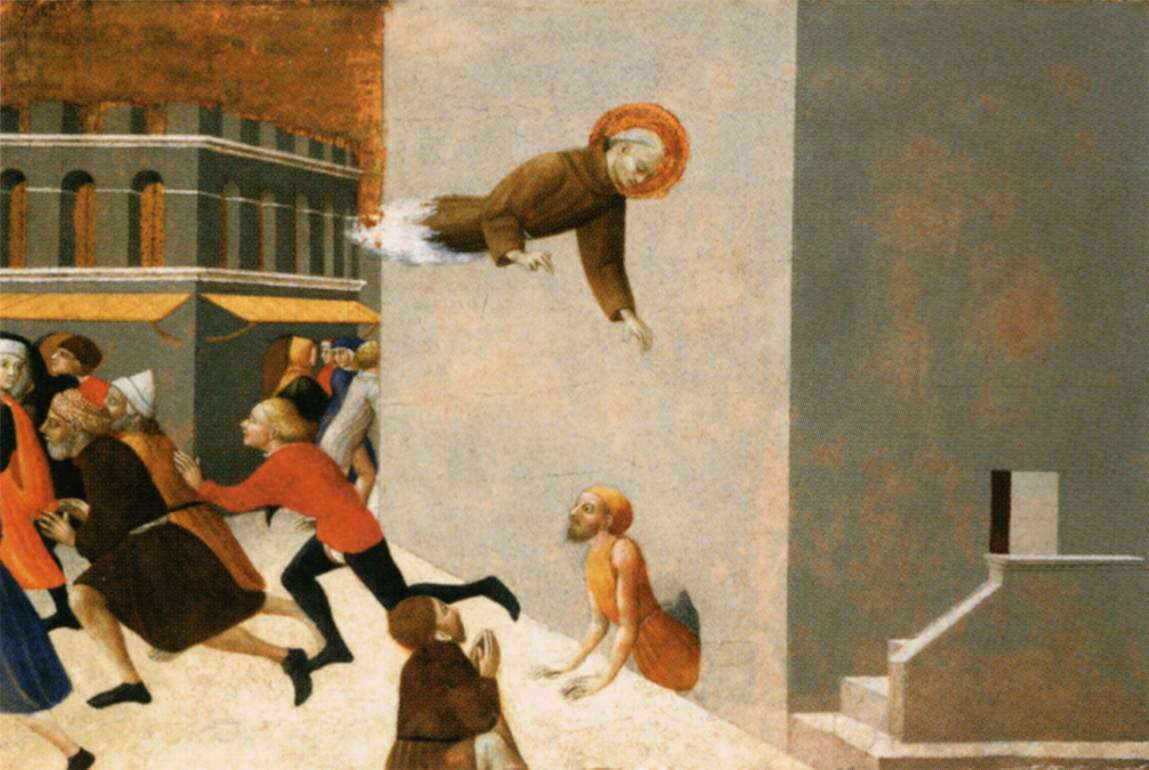
Sassetta, The Blessed Ranieri Rasini delivering the Poor from the Prison in Florence, 1437–1444

Later the prison also housed debtors and bankrupts, including the historians Giovanni Villani (caught up in the Bardi and Peruzzi banking crises) and Giovanni Cavalcanti (who described his time there in Storia dei suoi tempi). Niccolò Machiavelli was another inmate after he was implicated in the Orti Oricellari plot, as were the Florentine ambassador to France Roberto Acciaioli, Francesco Gianfigliazzi's wife (imprisoned in 1440 after smuggling herself into the city in disguise to plead her exiled husband's case) and the Neapolitan ambassador Pietro Vespucci (for his part in the Pazzi Plot). The painter Cennino Cennini may have written his Libro dell'arte whilst imprisoned there, but this is uncertain.

In 1428 the Florentine Republic authorised the Compagnia di Santa Maria della Croce al Tempio to hire a doctor, a chaplain, a barber and a caretaker to assist the Buonomi delle Stinche at the prison. The Compagnia became so popular that it was granted an annual public subsidy of 112 gold florins, which supplemented the donations and bequests it also received. Also in 1428 public wash-houses were built against the prison's south side, as shown by the street name via dei Lavatoi. The prison was sold off by the state in 1833 and partially demolished, making room for a building for equestrian shows and a home for the Società Filarmonica Fiorentina - the latter was later transformed into the Teatro di Pagliano, which later still became the Teatro Verdi. After the prison closed its inmates were moved to the Le Murate complex just to its east.

== Bibliography (in Italian) ==
- Francesco Lumachi, Firenze, nuova guida illustrata storica-artistica-aneddotica della città e dintorni, Firenze, Società Editrice Fiorentina, 1929
- Anita Valentini, L'iconografia fiorentina di Sant'Anna. Genesi ed evoluzione in I "fochi" della San Giovanni, XXXIII nº2 pagg. 7-33
- Pietro Jacopo Fraticelli, Delle antiche carceri di Firenze denominate Le Stinche or demolite e degli edifizi in quel luogo eretti l'anno 1834. Illustrazione storica, Firenze, Giuseppe Formigli, 1834;
- Fruttuoso Becchi, Sulle Stinche di Firenze e su' nuovi edifizi eretti in quel luogo, Firenze 1839;
- Della Compagnia di S. Maria della Croce al Tempio, Lezione recitata il 27 gennaio 1861 alla Società Colombaria Gio. Battista Uccelli, Firenze, Tipografia Calasanziana 1861.
