= Florentia (Roman city) =

Roman city

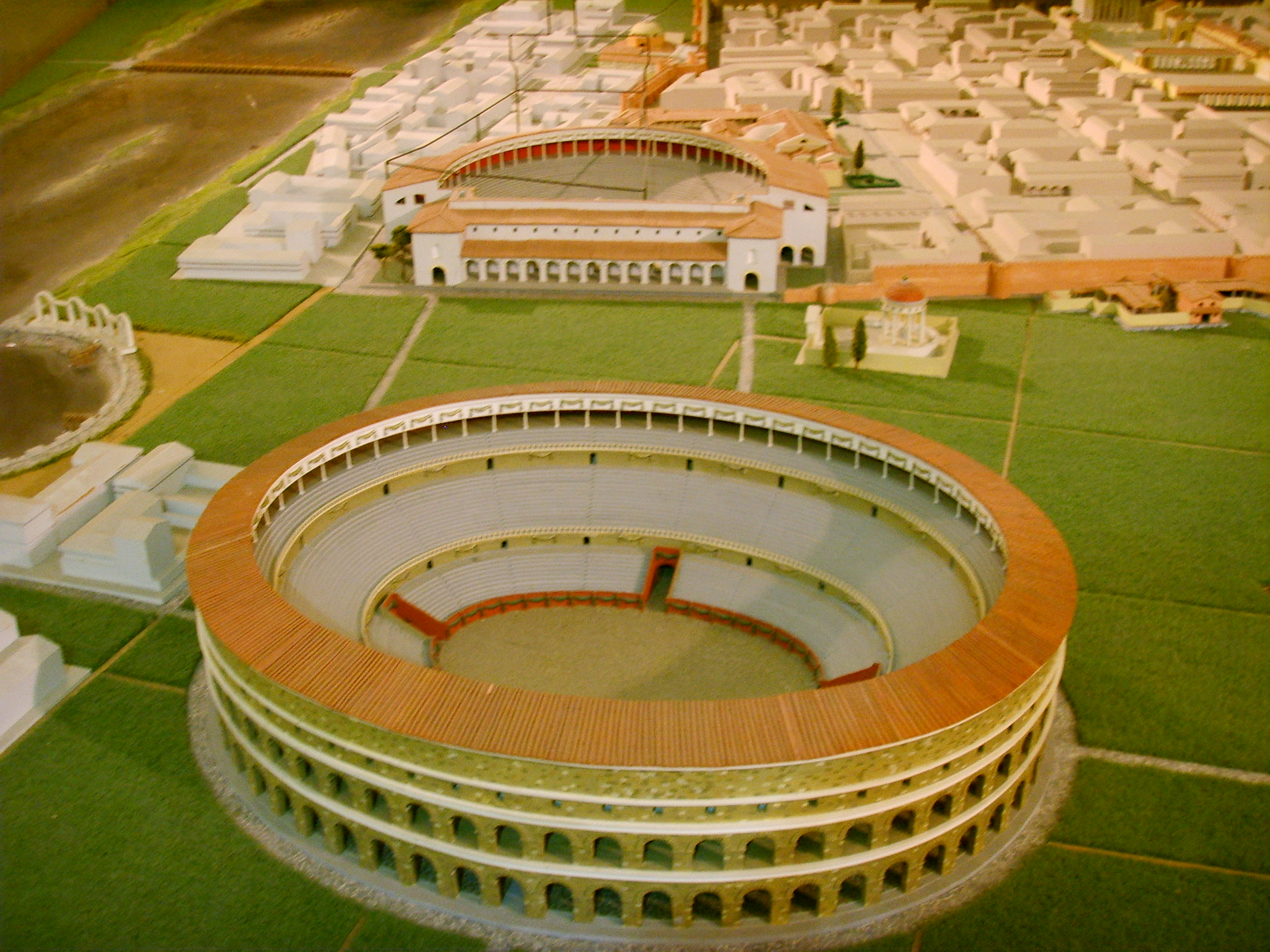
Plastic model with reconstruction of the Roman theatre and amphitheatre of Florentia

Florentia (Classical Latin pronunciation: [fɫoːˈrɛnti.a]) was a Roman city in the Arno valley, from which Florence originated. According to tradition, it was built by the legions of Gaius Julius Caesar in 59 BC; however, the prevailing hypothesis dates the foundation of the city to the Augustan period (between 30 and 15 BC).

== Etymology ==
Florentia is an auspicious name formed on the Latin verb florēre, "to flourish", of a type given to other Roman foundations as well; comparable names include Potentia, Placentia, Valentia and Pollentia, and the ancient name of Granada was Florentia Iliberritana. Medieval Latin also attests the form Frorentia.

The name is sparsely attested in classical antiquity. Pliny the Elder lists the Florentini settled on the Arno, immediately followed by Faesulae. A passage of Florus was long adduced as evidence that the city already existed as a splendidissimum municipium in the Sullan age, but that reading has been rejected: the place name is now regarded as the result of a faulty transcription.

The vernacular forms do not all continue the same Latin case. Fiorenza and Firenza derive from the nominative Florentia and are documented from 1235, whereas Firenze, attested from 1255, presupposes the genitive-locative Florentiae and a development of fio-, from flo-, to fi- in pretonic syllable. Gerhard Rohlfs observed, however, that the hypothesis of a surviving locative in Italian place names ending in -i or -e calls for further clarification, since several forms of this type are later than the corresponding forms in -a or -o; he also noted that in Tuscany the city is still frequently called Fiorenza. Other languages have kept forms closer to the Latin, as with Florence in French and English, Florenz in German and Florența in Romanian.

The Etruscan name of the small settlement that preceded the colony is not known.

Medieval and humanist tradition proposed other explanations. Giovanni Villani attributed the name to Florinus, a Roman officer killed on the site, and the Chronica de origine civitatis florentiae connected it with the flowers of the surrounding countryside or with the goddess Flora, the city being supposedly founded during the Floralia. Leonardo Bruni held that the city had first been called Fluentia, "flowing", because it lay between two rivers, and that the name was only later changed to Florentia.

== First settlements ==
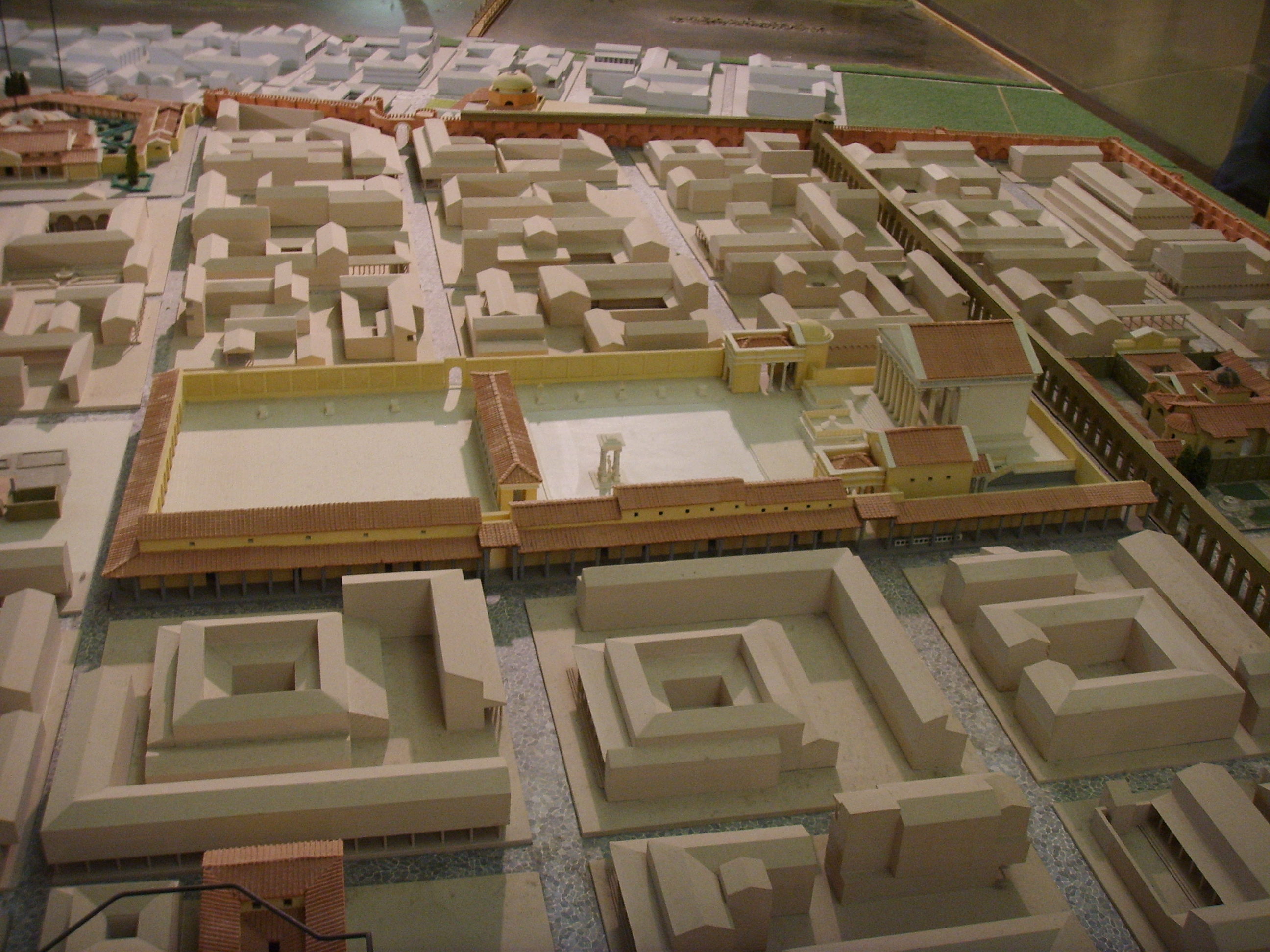
City model of Roman Florentia (Florence)

Traces of Copper Age burials have been found in the historical center of Florence, between Piazza della Signoria and Piazza della Repubblica.

In the Iron Age, the Florentine area was settled by the Villanovans, evidenced by burials dated to the eighth century BC. These were found between 1892 and 1906 in the historic center of the city, towards Via de' Vecchietti and under today's Hard Rock Cafe, in Piazza della Repubblica.

The city was probably situated in this location because it was easiest to ford the Arno, due to the shorter distance between the two banks. Moreover, the position on the watershed between the confluence of the tributaries of the Arno, Mugnone and Affrico gave the area a slightly higher altitude than the rest of the plain, which was probably marshy.

The area was continuously settled in the following time periods, since it assured the possibility of connection between inner Etruria and the city of Fiesole. It is probable that the Etruscans of Fiesole made a stable crossing of the river with a wooden footbridge or a ferryboat, at the point where the Arno narrows, around Ponte Vecchio. This may have been to ensure military control of such a strategic point, since it is located between the high course of the Arno, the Valdarno of Arezzo, and the low course that leads to Pisa and the sea. From stone slabs found on the bottom of the Arno, the size and type of the walkway can be deduced: it was wood mounted on stone piers.

After the Roman expansion in Etruria and the Po Valley, the settlement of the ford probably grew, not least because the Via Cassia, for a certain period, crossed the Arno right in the Florentine area, perhaps in the area of the current Ponte Vecchio.

East of today's Piazza Donatello, towards the Affrico torrent, there was probably an Etruscan-Roman urban agglomeration, which was an expansion of the Roman Fiesole towards the Arno in order to defend the Etruscan bridge which crossed the Arno at the height of today's Rovezzano. This was mentioned by medieval historians such as Giovanni Villani:

[...] the ancient bridge of the Fiesolani, which spanned the distance between Girone and Candegghi [today Girone and Candeli, hamlets of Florence]: and that was the ancient, straight road and route from Rome to Fiesole

— G. Villani Nuova Cronica Lib.II Cap. XX

This agglomeration may also have been an outpost first built at the time of the civil war between Gaius Marius and Lucius Cornelius Sulla, won by the latter who then conquered the colony, since it was allied with Marius. The decadence of Fiesole after 80 B.C. may also have led to a new impulse to settle in the valley.

== Roman Florentia ==
=== Colony foundation ===
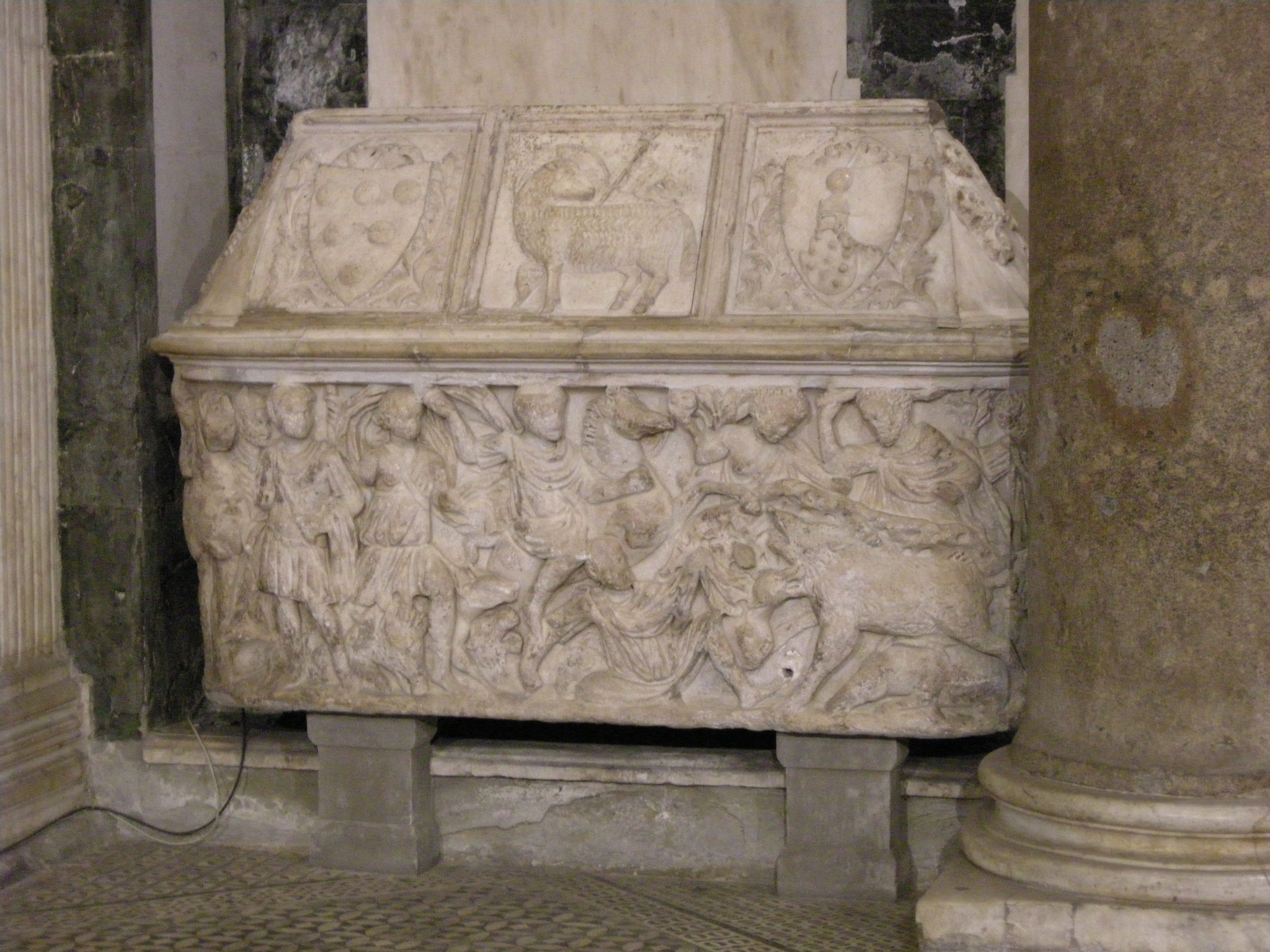
Baptistery, Roman sarcophagus representing the Hunting of Meleager

It is not known exactly when the colony of Florentia was founded, although most historians agree in dating it to 59 B.C. As well as mythological references, its foundation has been attributed to Sulla, Julius Caesar and Augustus.

Medieval historians suggested that, after Catilina's coup, which ended in 62 B.C. in Pistoria (Pistoia) and saw the Etruscan municipalities confederated against Rome, Caesar oversaw the construction of a castrum to control the city of Fiesole, because of the large number of Catilinarians, and so Florentia was born. The Liber Coloniarum, however, attributes the impetus to found a new city in this part of the Arno valley, where it crossed the river at the height of Ponte Vecchio, to Caesar's Lex Julia of 59 B.C.

The actual layout of the city and the centuriation of its territory dates to the second triumvirate. Intended to settle veterans by land allocation, it was built in the style of an army camp.

As usual in the foundation of new settlements, the city and its surroundings were defined according to a precise plan that involved both the urban layout and agricultural territory. The city followed the ideal rule of orientation according to the cardinal axes, while the surrounding territory was arranged taking into account the hydraulic conformation, rotating the axes as convenient. From aerial photos, even today, it is possible to distinguish the Cardo Maximum, oriented north–south along Via Roma to the Arno, and the Decumanus Maximus, oriented east–west along the current path of Via degli Strozzi and Via del Corso. These intersected at the height of the current Piazza della Repubblica, the seat of the Forum of the city, and the Campidoglio, surrounded by the main public buildings and temples. During the Roman era, the city was enriched with several buildings and infrastructure projects that characterized Roman cities: an aqueduct (from Monte Morello), two baths, a theater and an amphitheater, built outside the walls, as was customary.

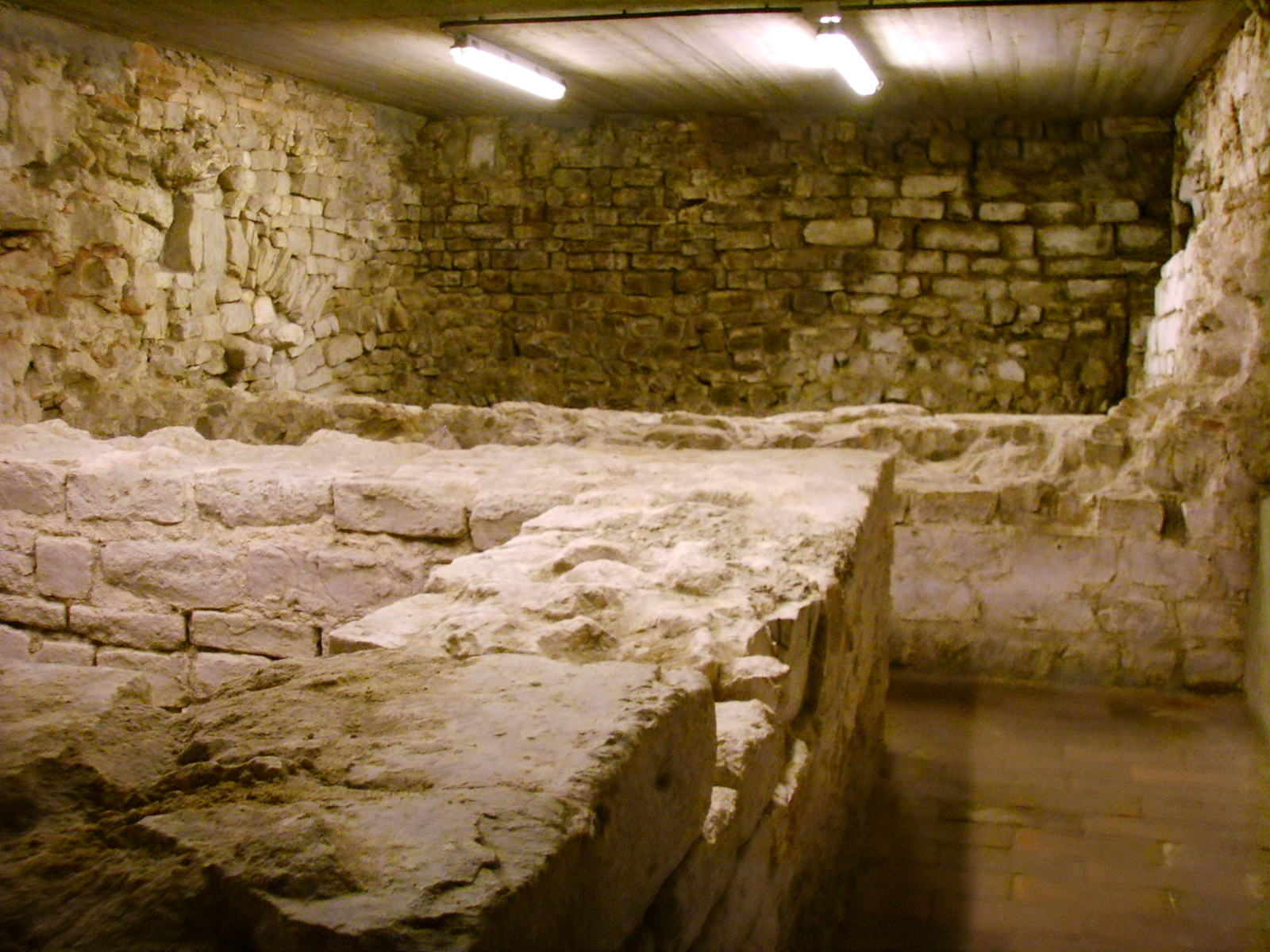
Remains of the Roman Baths under Torre della Pagliazza

=== Centuriation ===
Like all Roman colonies, centuriation of the surrounding territory was performed around Florentia. In particular, the flat and presumably marshy area west of the city was reclaimed in order to obtain plots of land to be assigned to veteran legionaries. The traces of the centuriation are still visible, for example, on IGM cartography, especially in editions from before the 50's, when urban expansion attacked the plain between Florence and Campi and beyond. The geometric regularity of the fields in the few areas not yet urbanized is a legacy of the vast Roman land reclamation, which connected the colony of Florentia to the centuriation of Pistoriae, extending over the entire plain between Florence and Prato.

From cartographic study, it is possible to reconstruct the scheme of the centuriation as a whole, made up of squares about 710 metres (2,330 feet) on each side.

=== Roman buildings ===
==== Temples ====
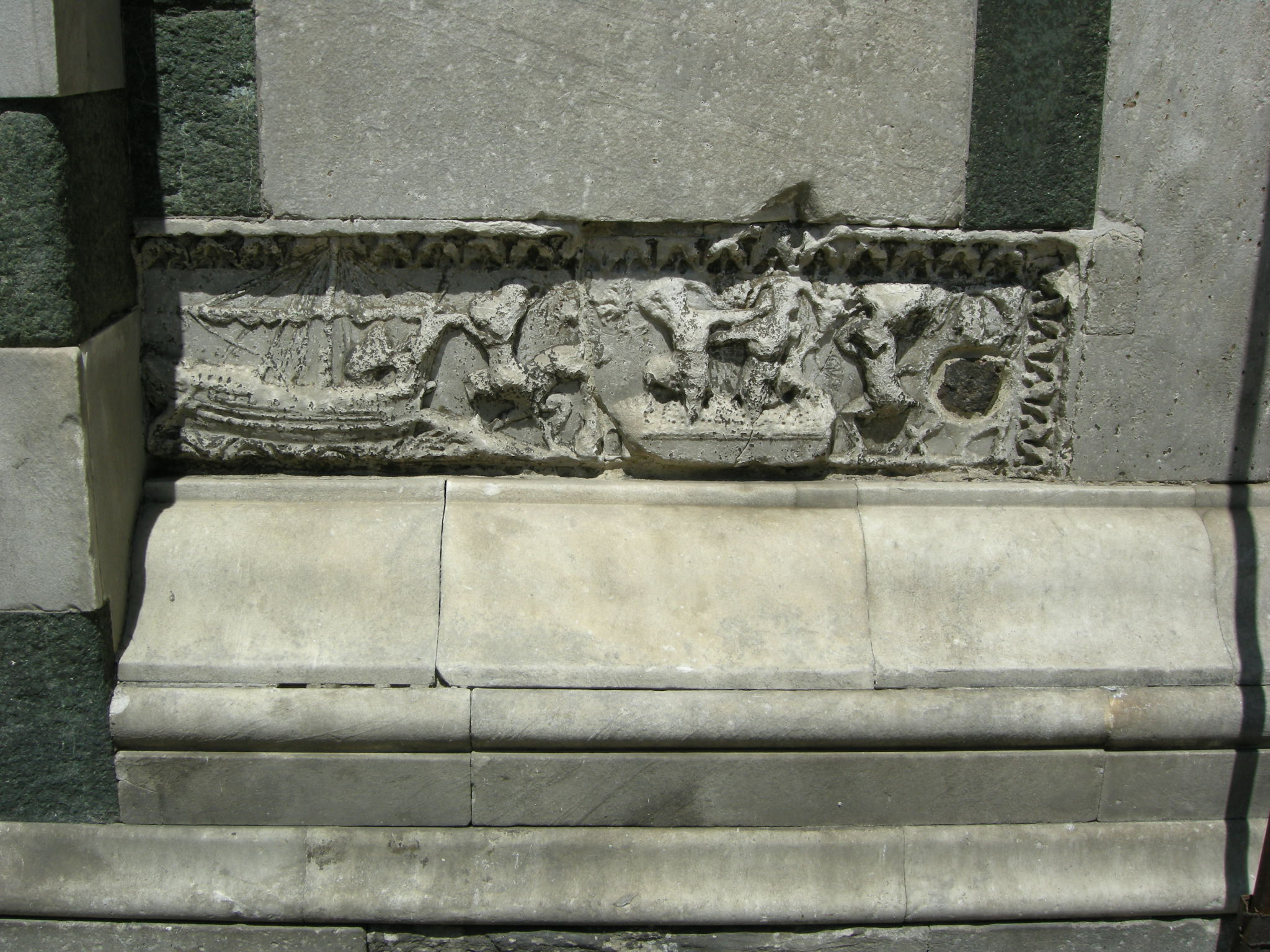
Representation of grape harvest and "oneraria ship" on a Roman relief reused in the Baptistery

According to Guicciardini, the Romans who built Florentia were:

not a useless and seditious rabble, but military men [...] who, through martial prowess and the good fortune of their victories, earned these rewards [...]

— Guiccardini, Cose Fiorentine

Medieval historians believed that, following this military tradition, the main temple of the city was dedicated to the god Mars. Later, it was re-identified with John the Baptist, and this change of patron was highlighted by Dante in the Inferno:

My home was in the city whose first patron gave way to John the Baptist

— Dante Inf. XIII, 143

Lorenzo Ghiberti, in his 15th century Chronicle, wondered:

Must we, then, always bear in mind that Mars once had altars and incense here? Close to where the square bell tower now rises imposingly beside the majestic dome of the Cathedral, Gradivus once had his temple—which still stands there today.

Gradivus (he who goes) was one of the various names or attributes of the God Mars. Villani, meanwhile, suggested that the Florentines refused to destroy their idol of Mars but "consecrated their said temple in honour of God and of the blessed S. John the Baptist, and called it the Duomo of S. Giovanni."

Architectural evidence has suggested, however, that the main temple of Florentia was the Capitolium. Scampoli suggests that the temple was built around the middle of the 1st century BC, perhaps as the colony was being established, then underwent some renovations during the Augustan period, and was embellished and finished during the Hadrianic era.

Outside the walls, traces of a Temple of Isis, likely built in the 2nd century A.D, were found and excavated between October and December 2008.

==== Other buildings ====
During the Roman era, the city expanded in all directions: north into the religious area of the Temple of Mars and then the ancient Church of Santa Reparata and south to the Arno and even beyond, where a colony of Syrian traders settled, who developed the first nucleus of Christians in the city.

More than anything else, the city extended eastwards, as shown by the foundations of civil buildings and remains of baths from the imperial period, discovered during excavations in Piazza della Signoria, but especially on the slope leading to Piazza San Firenze below. On this natural slope, the Romans built the Theatre of the city in the 1st century A.D., which emerges from under the Palazzo Vecchio and Palazzo Gondi. The Skene was probably in the area where the Complex of San Firenze now sits, and the public steps led towards Piazza della Signoria.

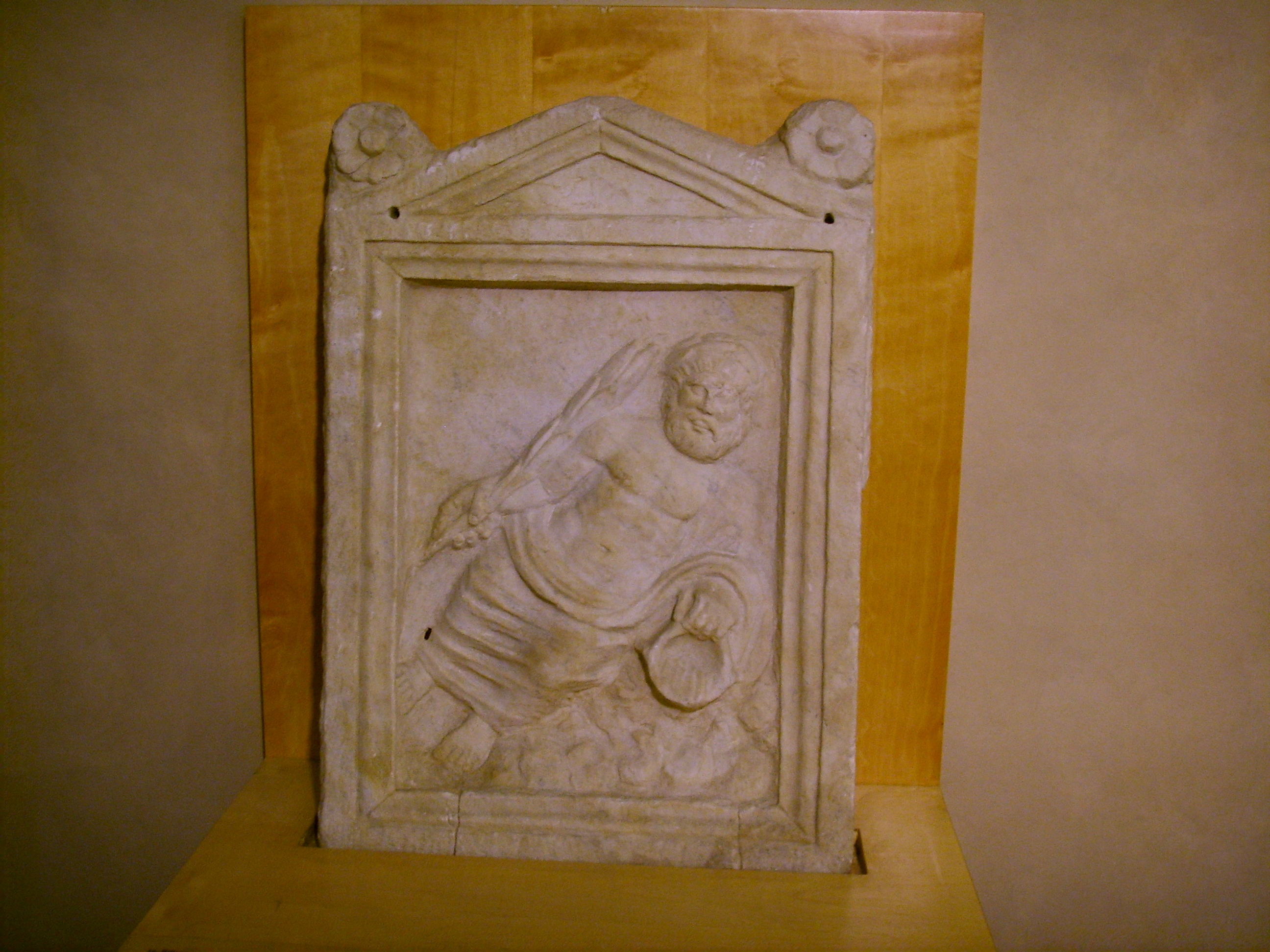
Bas-relief found under the entrance of the Gambrinus cinema representing a river divinity; this icon, which probably represents the Arno, was situated in a staircase which is believed to belong to the well coeval with the foundation of the city.

The foundations of the walls, with defensive towers, were found under Via del Proconsolo and, according to the most recent excavations, date back to the period between 30 and 15 B.C. They were, on average, two meters thick and surrounded an area of about 20 hectares. Other Roman remains have been found under the nearby Palazzo dell'Arte dei Giudici e Notai, including an industrial facility which may have been for dyeing. Under the Church of Santa Felicita there is a stretch of the Via Cassia. Excavations have also identified civic buildings near the original castrum wall.

One of the few Roman structures actually recognizable is the Amphitheater, which was outside the castrum, in the current medieval district of Santa Croce. The first person to make an in-depth study of this structure was the scholar Domenico Maria Manni who, in 1746, published the book Notizie istoriche intorno al Parlagio ovvero anfiteatro di Firenze. Surrounded by a road that, appropriately, has been called Via Tórta since the Middle Ages, the amphitheater of Florentia was of medium size (about 20,000 seats, compared to the 87,000 of the Colosseum), perhaps testifying to the meagreness of the local population. It remains perfectly recognizable in its load-bearing structures, even if here, as in other cases (e.g. the amphitheater of Lucca), the superimposition of medieval houses has closed the ancient arches (the fornices) and exploited all the spaces of the small amphitheater.

Under Hadrian, the increasingly important Florentia was added to the Via Cassia and united with the roads of the empire. In 285 AD, under Diocletian, it was chosen to be the seat of the Corrector Tusciae et Umbriae and thus became the capital of Tuscia, northern Etruria and Umbria. Notably, Florentia was chosen over older towns like Fiesole, Arezzo and Perugia.

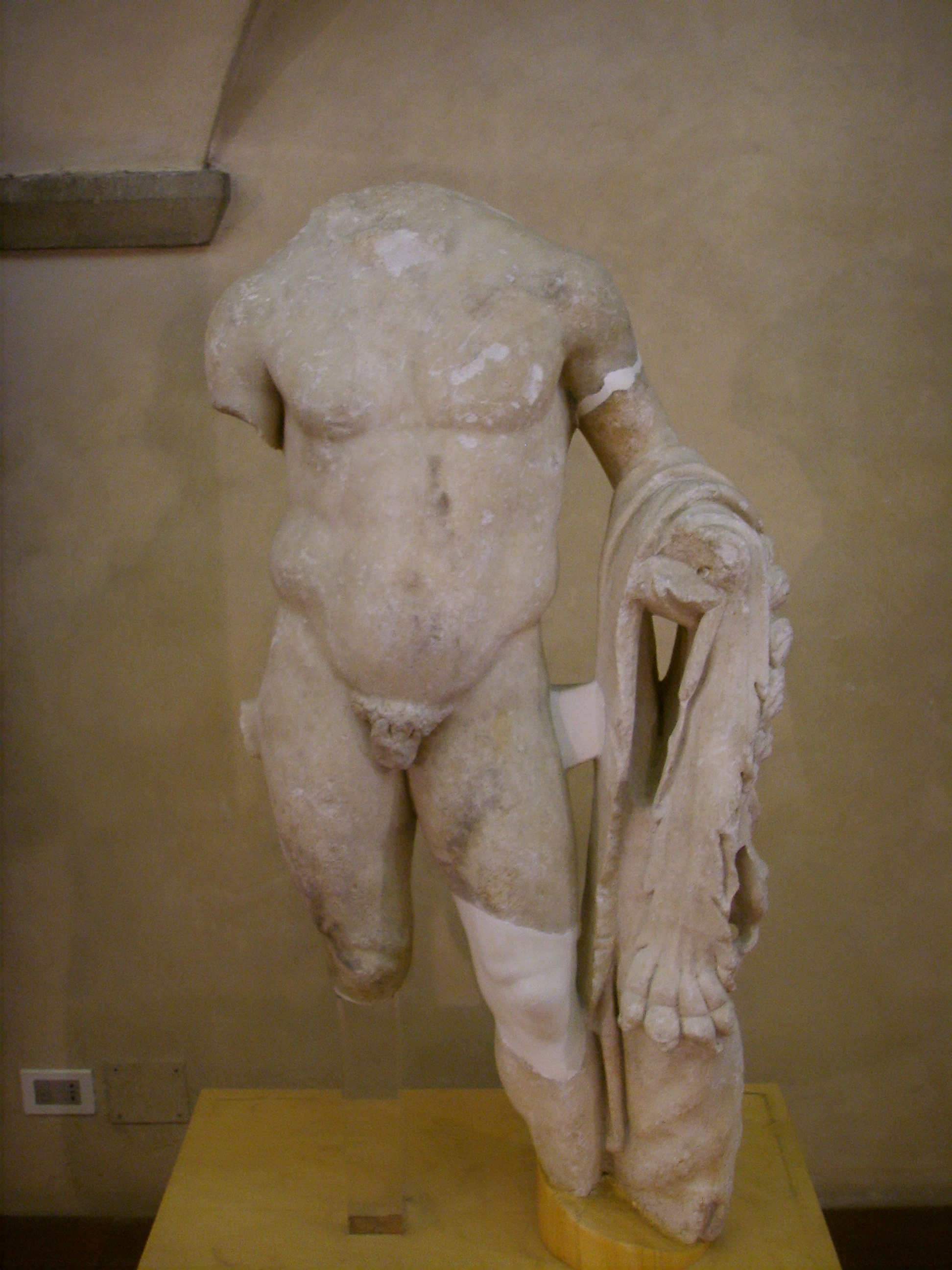
Statue of Hercules found near via del Capaccio

The medieval city did not immediately overlap the ancient Florentia, and, in 1400, Guicciardini described the remains of Florentia:

[...] still visible in the buildings erected by them [the Romans], certainly bear witness to the fact that the city's original structures were truly magnificent—above all the Temple of Mars [...] and the aqueducts, built more for ostentation and in imitation of Rome than out of necessity

— Guiccardini, Cose Fiorentine

In the nineteenth century, some of the names of the streets around Piazza della Repubblica were chosen on the basis of the Roman findings in the underground, including Via delle Terme, Via del Campidoglio, and Via di Capaccio. The latter name refers to the Caput Aquae, the outlet of the aqueduct which Villani's Nuova Cronica attributed to Macrino, Caesar's general.

=== Surrounding territories ===
Towards the south, Florentia bordered an area named Bagno a Ripoli, in the municipality of Chianti, contiguous to today's city. In Roman times, this was a place of leisure and rest, as can be seen from the discovery of villas and thermae. The most interesting evidence of Roman Etruria is the archaeological area of Fiesole, with an almost intact theater and baths, built in the Republican era and embellished under the emperors Claudius and Septimus Severus.

To the north of the city passed the Via Cassia and, as in many other cities of Roman origin, some areas have taken their name from the distance, in Roman miles, from the city. In the case of Florentia, in the north-west direction are found, from the third mile onwards, Terzolle (and Le Tre Pietre), Quarto, Quinto, Sesto Fiorentino and Settimello.

== Christianity in Florentia ==
The suburbs of Oltrarno, where a large community of oriental traders, especially Syrians, lived, were the cradle of new religions, including Mithraism, the Egyptian cult of the goddess Isis and Christianity. These villages were, however, a suburb of the city and were, as Guicciardini writes, inhabited by "vile people", while the center of the city was in the hands of patrician families linked to the old religion.

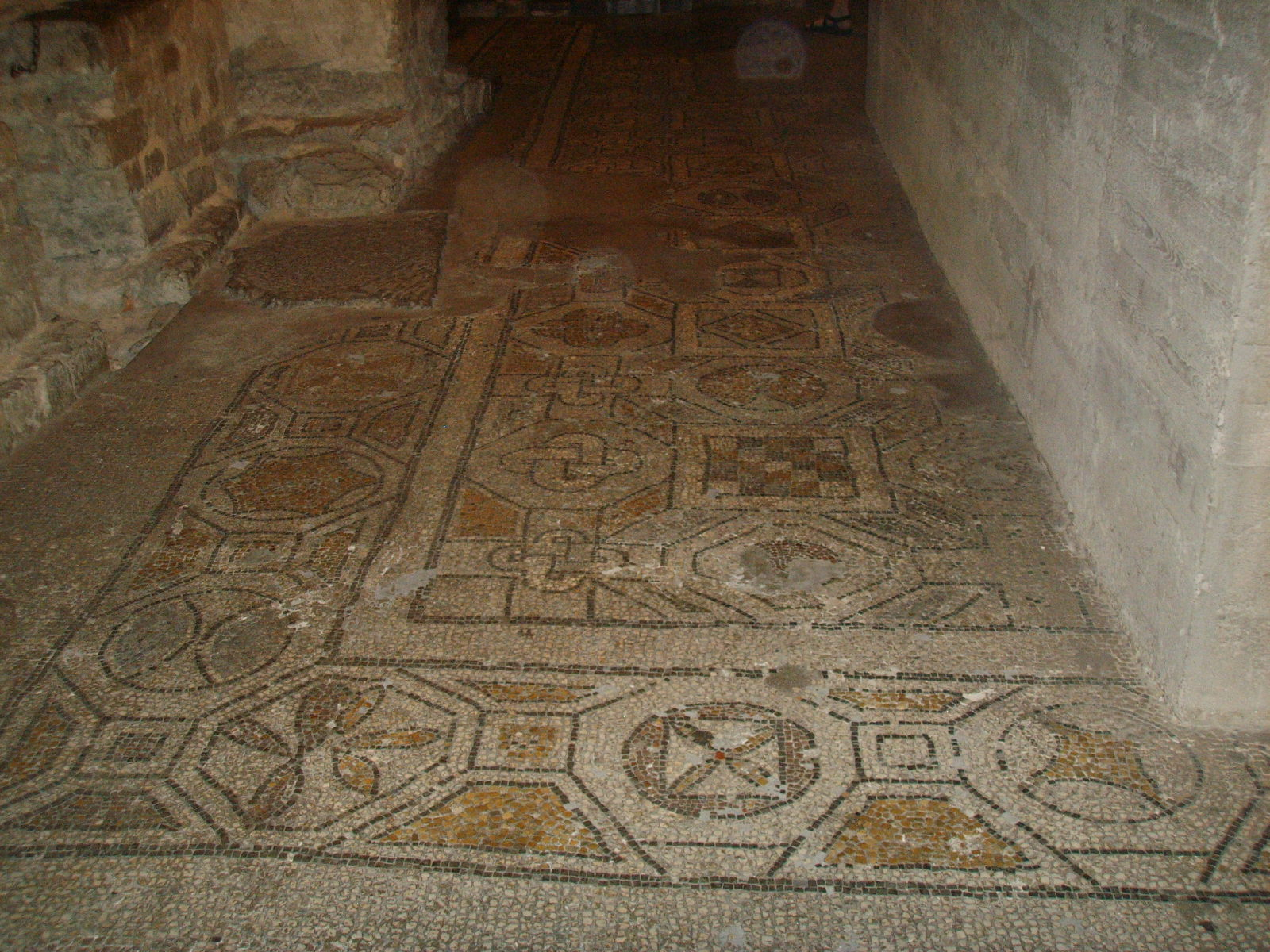
Floor of the Church of Santa Reparata

The mysterious oriental religions worried the Florentine patriciate because of the hold they had on the "vile people", but the greatest danger was the influence that the religious leaders of Christianity had on the crowds.

There are some specific early references to Christianity in Florence. For example, the Armenian hermit Minias (d. 250 A.D.) was one of the most famous martyrs of Florentia, and his bones are buried in the church of San Miniato al Monte, dedicated to him after his martyrdom occurred in the Amphitheater. There is also record of a Bishop "Felix from Florence of the Tuscans" being present at a 313 Synod. With Constantine, Christianity was legalized in 313, and then became the state religion of the empire under Theodosius I in 380. The official organization of the church in Florence has been attributed to San Zanobi (337 - 417), who was elected bishop around 384.

== Disappearance of Roman Florentia ==
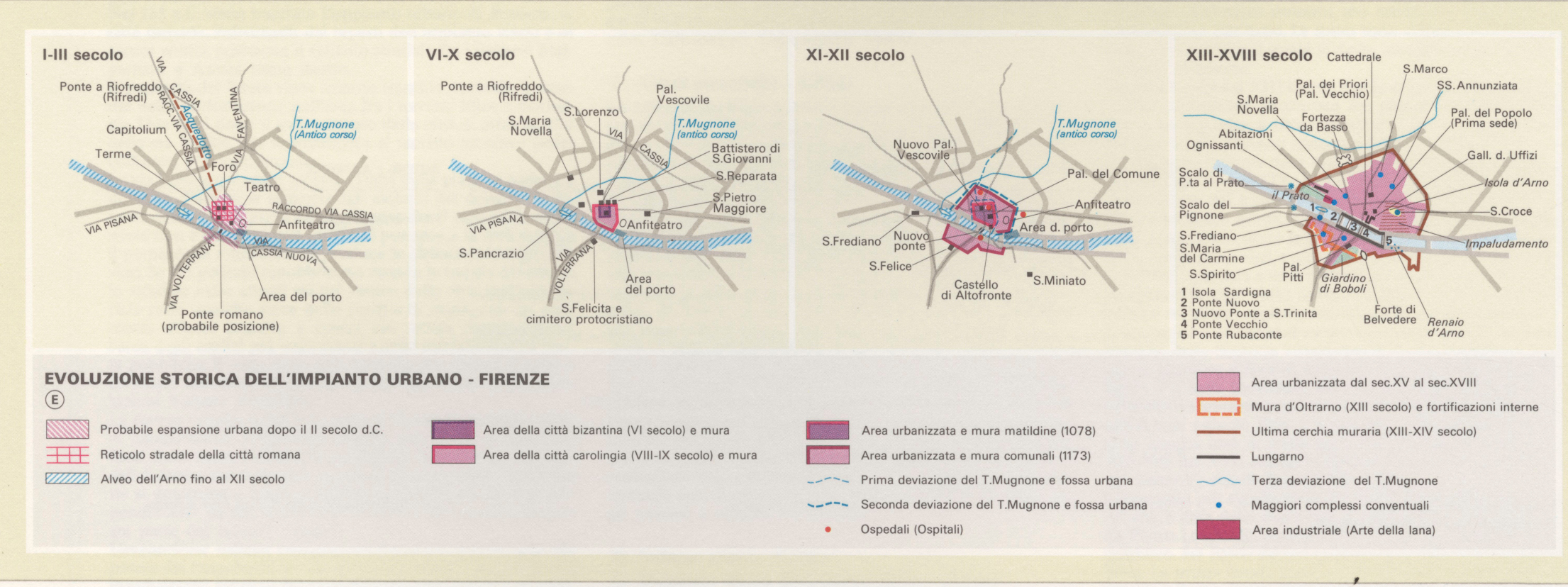
Development of the city from I to XVIII century

Between the first and second century, the city was fully part of the vast and organized commercial system of the Roman Empire, thanks to the river port, which allowed trade with Pisa. Archaeological excavations have documented, among others, trade with Gaul and Africa and Strabo (c. 64 B.C - c. 24 A.D) testifies that the Arno was a navigable river. At the height of today's Piazza de' Giudici (or the Piazza Mentana), there were docks for loading and unloading of goods, in an area that is still called the Customs, and is more or less where the Rowing Club of Florence sits today.

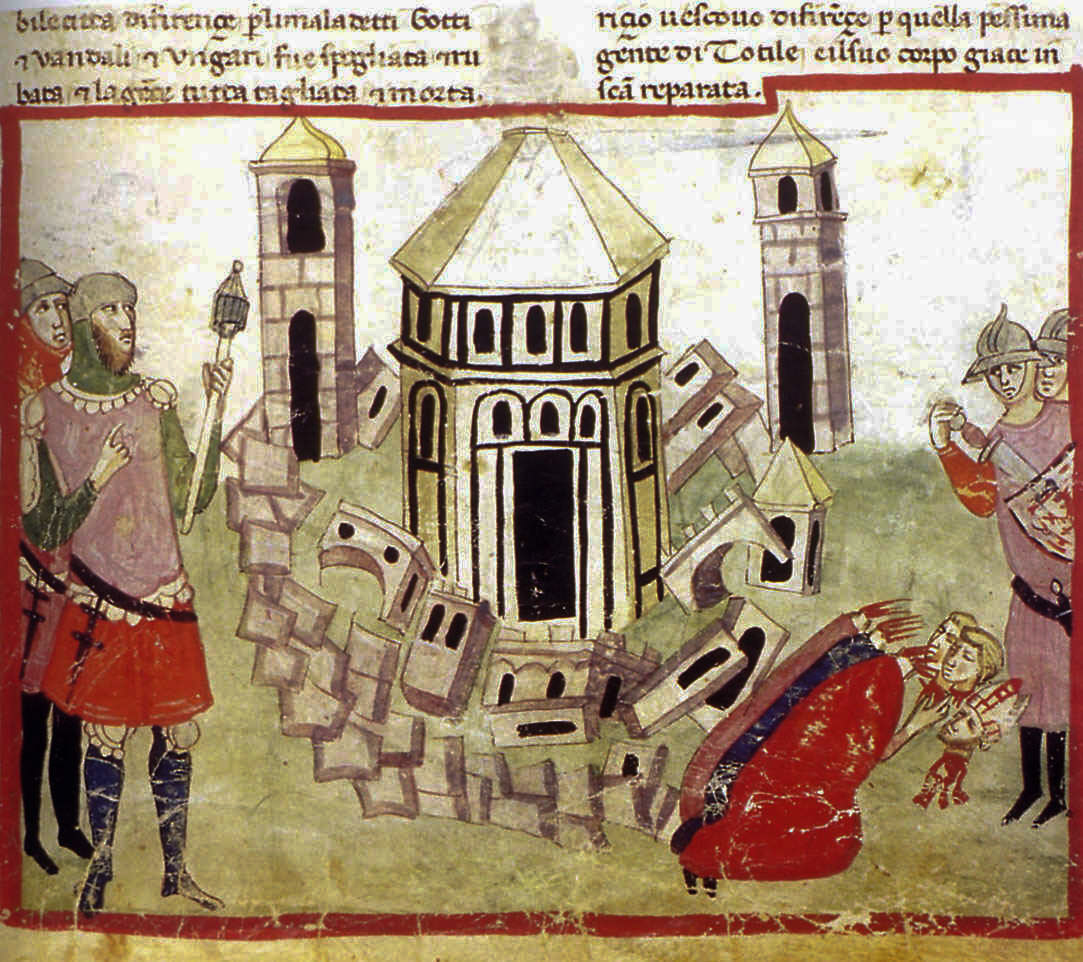
Totila razes the walls of Florence during the Gothic War (535–554)

This economic well-being inevitably attracted raids by the barbarian kings who raged in Italy. It was besieged by the Ostrogoths twice: first, in 405 or 406, led by Radagaiso, and again in 542, this time commanded by King Totila. In the late empire, the city was affected by the general crisis, including the economic crisis, of the empire. In the sixth century, with the Greek-Gothic wars and invasion by the Lombards, the situation of general decline worsened, not least due to the interruption of commercial traffic and the general impoverishment of the city. Between the sixth and the eighth century, the urban structure of the city probably came into crisis, with a demographic decline, abandonment of the outer areas and the general and progressive degradation of all buildings and walls.

Beginning in the eleventh century, new building growth left few vestiges of the past. The remains of the theater, baths, amphitheater and other buildings were incorporated into new buildings or used as foundations. The Forum Square was densely built up and later became part of the Ghetto, around Mercato Vecchio.

With the Savoy arrangement of the Piazza del Mercato Vecchio, when Florence was the capital of Italy (the so-called Risanamento), the Ghetto was demolished, and the most important remains of the Capitol and the Forum disappeared with it. Of the findings made during this work, only cursory surveys were made and the evidence collected by the architect Corinto Corinti.

== Roman art in Florence ==
Almost all of the Roman art present in Florence today, apart from a few rare examples of sarcophagi, did not belong to Florentia, but was brought from Rome at the time of the Medici and Lorena families. This includes the collection of ancient statues that decorate the Loggia dei Lanzi, the Uffizi Gallery, Palazzo Pitti and the Boboli Gardens, including the obelisk. The city's Roman column, located in Piazza Santa Trinita in front of the church of the same name, comes from the Baths of Caracalla, and was a gift from Pope Pius IV to Grand Duke Cosimo I. The Roman collections of the National Archaeological Museum have various origins and were mostly brought to the city between the nineteenth and twentieth century, with the exception of the materials collected in the so-called "courtyard of the Florentines".

== See also ==
- List of cities founded by the Romans

== Bibliography ==
- Discorsi di Vincenzo Borghini, Dell'origine della Città di Firenze, (1584), Volume 1, a cura di Domenico Maria Manni, Società tipografica de'Classici italiani, 1808
- D. M. Manni, Notizie istoriche intorno al Parlagio ovvero Anfiteatro di Firenze, Firenze 1746
- G. F. Gamurrini, Rapporto del Regio Commissario, commendator Gamurrini (materiali dal tempio di Iside), in Notizie degli Scavi 1886, p. 177
- L. A. Milani, Pozzo praticabile presso le Terme e il Campidoglio nel foro Fiorentino, in Notizie degli Scavi 1893, pp. 493–496
- D. Fraschetti, Il Tempio di Marte e la Chiesa di S. Giovanni Battista, in Arte e Storia 27, 1908, p. 182 sgg.
- A. Guerri, Cenni topografici su Firenze romana, in Illustratore Fiorentino n.s. VI.1-5, 1909, pp. 94–99
- Corinti C., Degli avanzi del teatro di Firenze romana, in Atti della Società Colombaria, Firenze. 1924
- Maetzke G., Florentia (Firenze). Regio VII - Etruria, Italia romana: Municipi e Colonie, I, 5, Roma. 1941
- Hardie C., The Origin and Plain of Roman Florence, Journal of Roman Studies 1965, LV, pp. 122–140
- F. Chiostri, L'acquedotto romano di Firenze, Firenze 1973
- E. Mensi, La fortezza di Firenze e il suo territorio in epoca romana, Firenze 1991
- P. Degl'Iinnocenti, Le origini del Bel San Giovanni. Da tempio di Marte a battistero di Firenze, Firenze 1994
- G. Capecchi (a cura di), Alle origini di Firenze. Dalla Preistoria alla città romana, Firenze 1996.
- Martini F., Poggesi G., Sarti L. (a cura di), Lunga memoria della piana, L'area fiorentina dalla preistoria alla romanizzazione, Guida alla mostra, Firenze. 1999
- F. Salvestrini, Libera città su fiume regale. Firenze e l'Arno dall'Antichità al Quattrocento, Firenze 2005
- Francesco Maria Petrini, Florentia Ostrogota, in V. D'Aquino – G. Guarducci – S. Nencetti – S. Valentini (edd.), Archeologia a Firenze: Città e Territorio: Atti del Workshop. Firenze, 12-13 Aprile 2013, “Archeologia a Firenze: città e territorio”, Oxford 2015, pp. 225–246.
