= Orcagna =

Italian painter, sculptor and architect (c. 1308–1368)

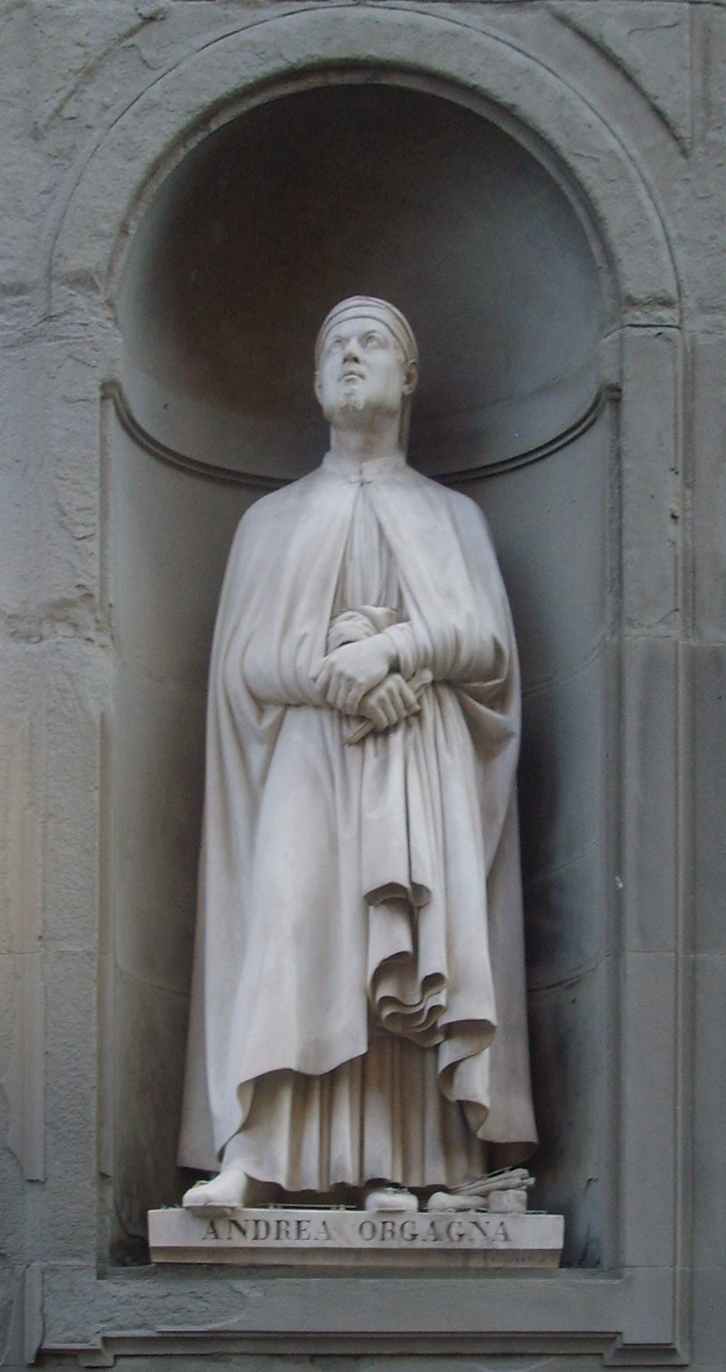
Statue of Andrea Orcagna on the Piazzale degli Uffizi in Florence carved by Niccolò Bazzanti

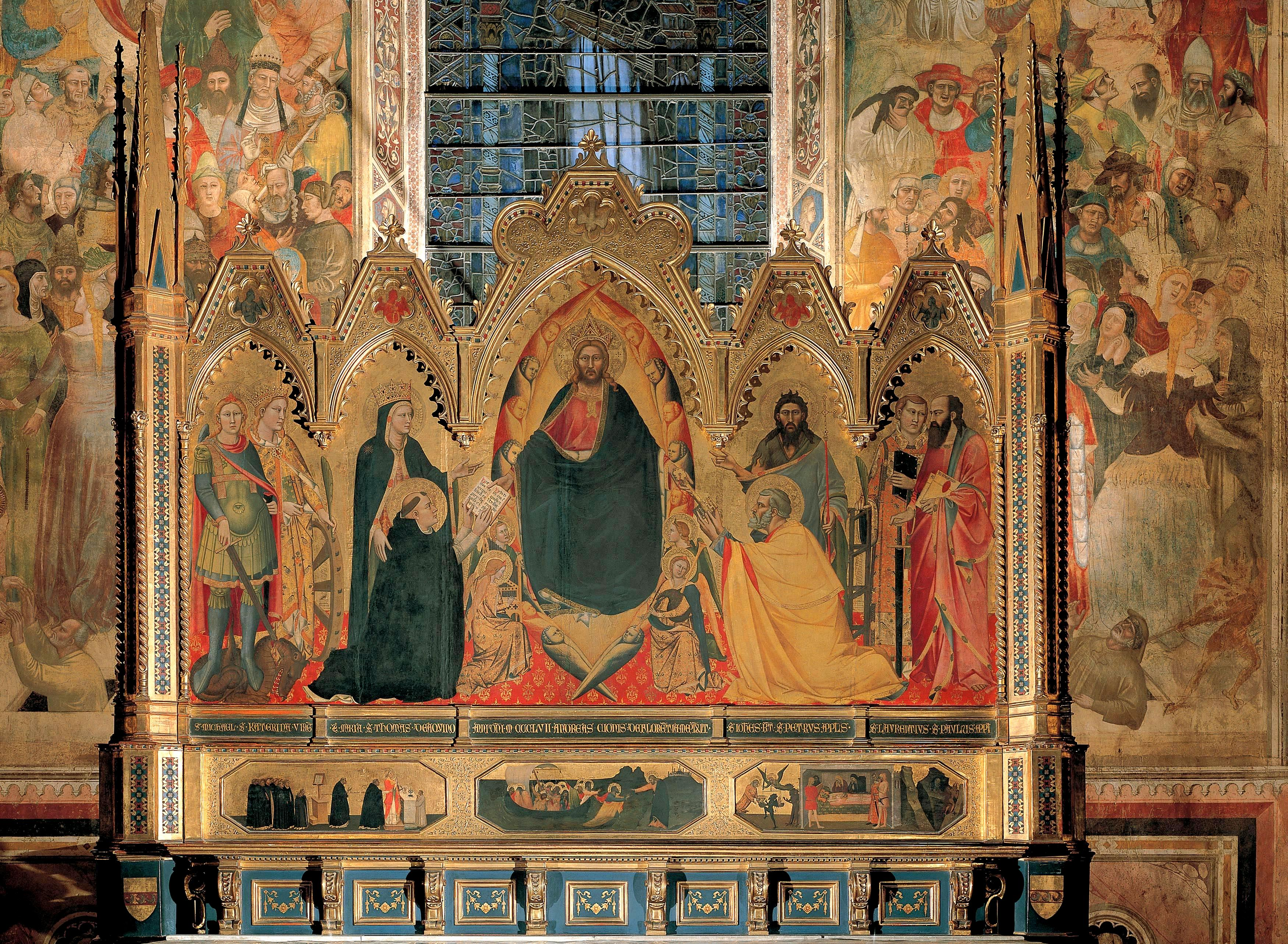
Strozzi Altarpiece (1354–1357), Santa Maria Novella, Florence, Italy

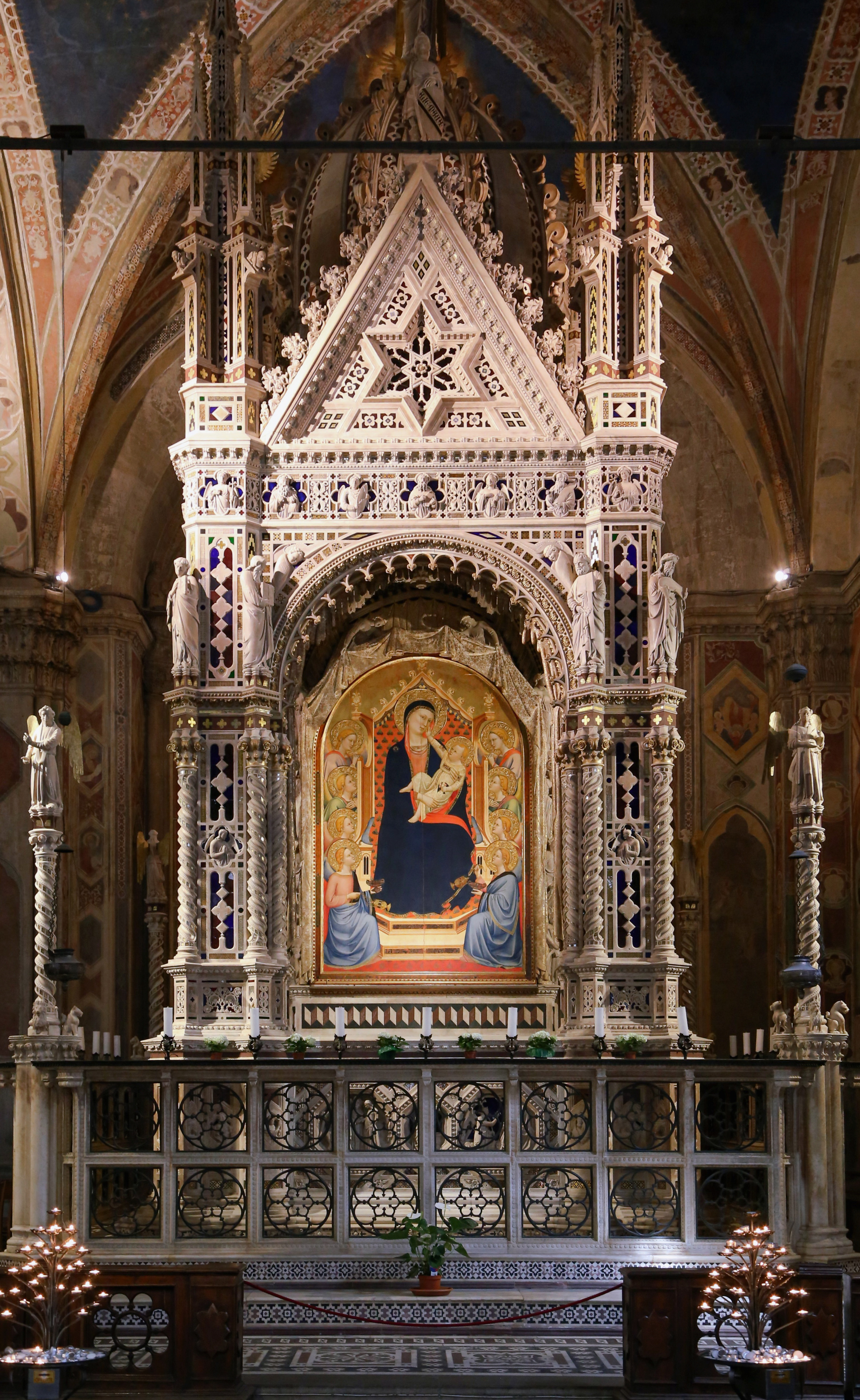
Tabernacle of Orsanmichele (1352–1359)

Andrea di Cione di Arcangelo (c. 1308 – 25 August 1368), better known as Orcagna, was an Italian painter, sculptor, and architect active in Florence. He worked as a consultant at the Florence Cathedral and supervised the construction of the façade at the Orvieto Cathedral. His monumental marble tabernacle (1352–1359), commissioned by the confraternity of Orsanmichele to protect the Maestà by Bernardo Daddi (1347) at Orsanmichele, was immediately praised. The tabernacle, executed according to his design with the assistance of a team of selected sculptors and masons, included 117 figural sculptures or reliefs as part of a domed structure.

His Strozzi Altarpiece (1354–1357) is noted as defining a new role for Christ as a source of Catholic doctrine and papal authority, as central figure enthroned actively handing out the (Dominican, or generally the Mendicant theology to Thomas Aquinas, and the keys of the church to St. Peter.

== Works ==
Orcagna's works include:

- Fresco of Saint Anne calling the citizens of Florence to arms against the tyrant Walter VI, Count of Brienne, Duke of Athens, formerly in the Stinche Prison (c. 1343), a huge circular painting with a truthful depiction of the Palazzo Vecchio, where it is displayed today.
- Altarpiece of the Redeemer (1354–1357) in the Strozzi di Mantova Chapel at Santa Maria Novella, Florence
- The tabernacle in Orsanmichele (1352–1359)
- The mosaic decoration and the design for the rose window of the cathedral of Orvieto is attributed to Orcagna, who had become Master of the Works in 1359.
- His fresco of the Crucifixion with a multitude of angels surrounding the cross, portrayed on a dark background and a few fragments of the Last Supper (1365).

== Pupils ==
Among Orcagna's pupils and legacy were:

- Nello di Vanni, a Pisan painter of the 14th century, who also worked for the Campo Santo. Nello di Vanni is conjectured to be identical with Bernardo Nello or Giovanni Falcone.
- Tommaso del Mazza, called Tomasso di Marco by Giorgio Vasari.
- Jacopo di Cione, brother of Andrea and mainly sculptor and architect.
