= Tommaso del Mazza =

Italian painter

Tommaso del Mazza, also known as the Master of Santa Verdiana, (active 1377–1392) was an Italian painter.

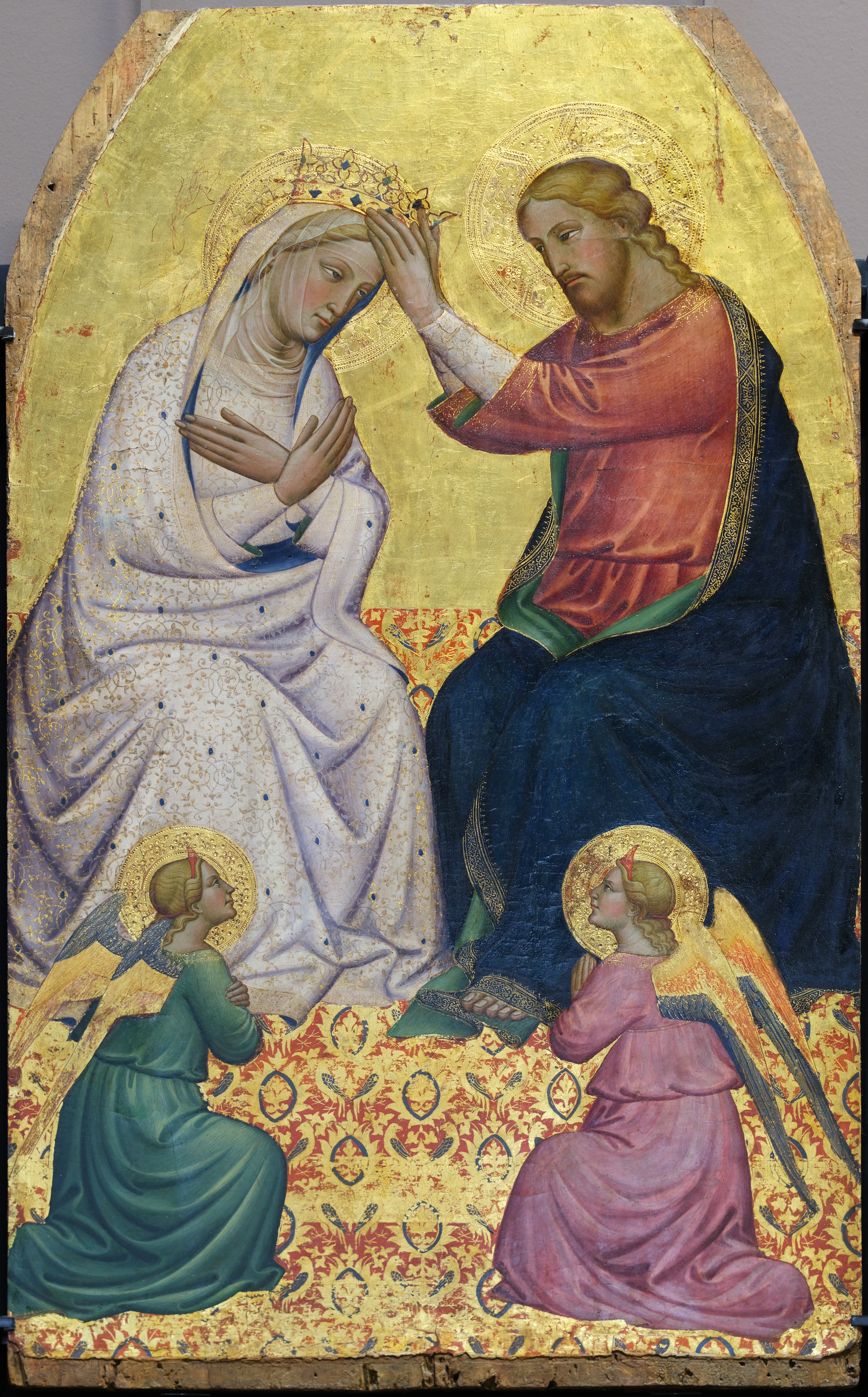
Coronation of the Virgin (1380–1395), Museum of the Louvre

== Biography ==
He trained in Florence, initially in the studio of Andrea Orcagna, but later with his brother Jacopo di Cione. He painted in typical Gothic art style, with gilded backgrounds.

Among his known works are:

- Annunciation at the Getty Museum in California, likely originating from the Piccolomini Chapel at the Church of San Francesco, Pienza.
- Madonna and Child with Six Saints (1390) at the High Museum of Art in Atlanta, Georgia.
- Series of Panels with Passion and Life & Coronation of Virgin Scenes (1365-1375) putatively from the Oratory of the Confraternity of Jesus and the Cross in Florence (Confraternita di Gesù e della Croce)
- Coronation of the Virgin (1380-1390) at the Louvre Museum in Paris, France
- The Virgin and Child with Saints and Donors (ca. 1400), National Gallery of Ireland, in Dublin, Ireland
- St. Paul and a Deacon, St. Jude Thaddeus and St. John the Evangelist, and St. Peter at the Museum & Gallery at Bob Jones University, Greenville, SC.
- Madonna with Child and the Archangel Michael, circa 1375. tempera and gold ground on canvas on wood, at Koller. Old Master Paintings. Auction 20 September 2024, p. 2–3: Lot 3001*.
