= Roman Theatre of Florence =

Ancient Roman theater in Florence, Italy

Coordinates: 43°46′9.36″N 11°15′26.25″E

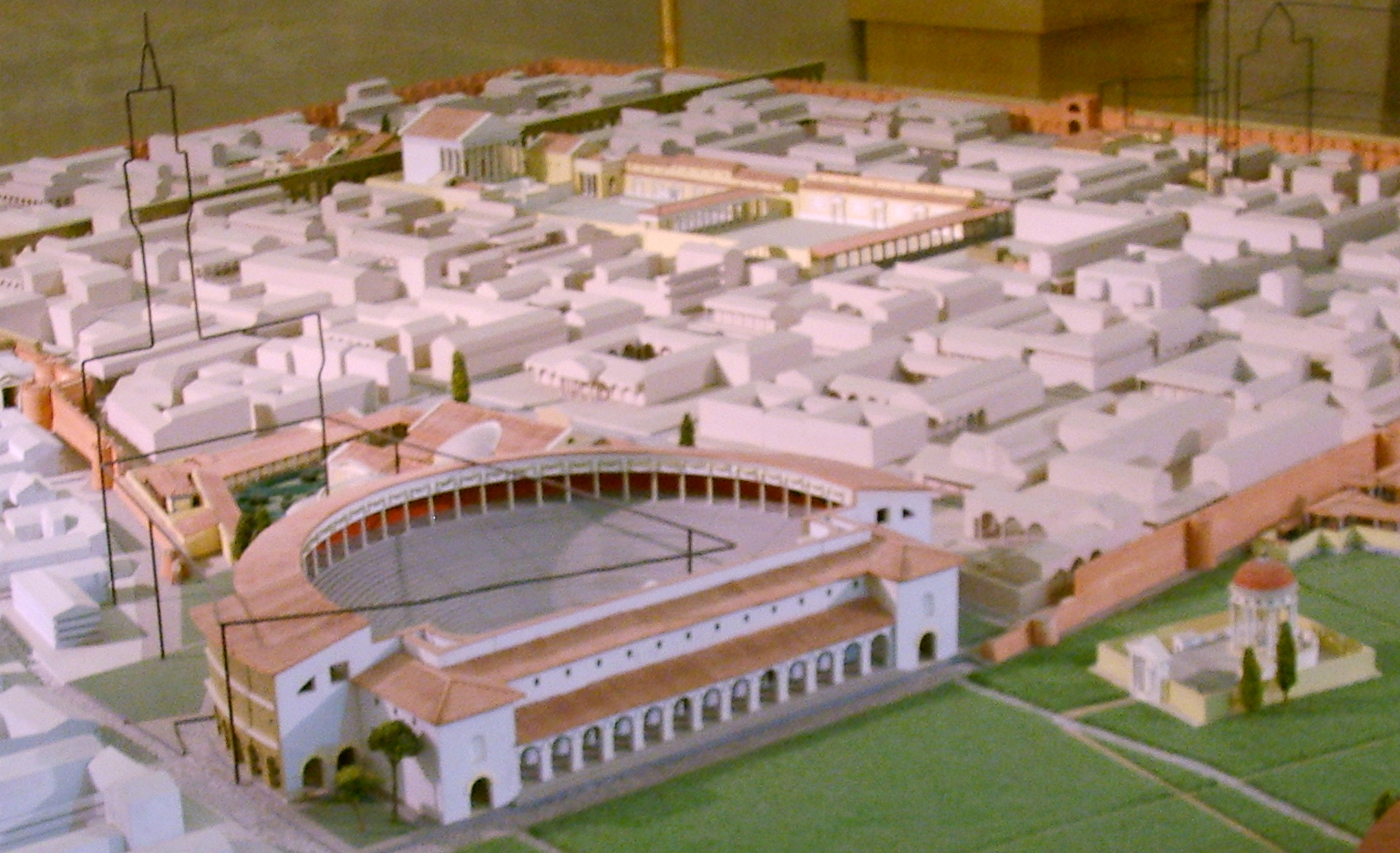
Model of the Roman theatre in the Florence Museum

The Roman Theatre of Florence was a Roman theatre dated to the 1st century in Florentia, Italy. It was located under the current Palazzo Vecchio and Palazzo Gondi, with the auditorium facing Piazza della Signoria and along the Piazza San Firenze and Via dei Leoni.

The first remains of the theatre were excavated in 1876. Other excavations took place in the underground at the Palazzo Vecchio in 1935. Archeological digs have resumed recently, notably in 2006-2007 by Riccardo Francovich.

The building, which has been dated to 1st century AD, was a semicircular shape with a very large capacity, demonstrating the demographic development of the city at the time. Estimates place its capacity at around 15,000 spectators, the same as the Teatro Marcello of Rome. It was around 100 metres in length and 35 metres in width.

== See also ==
- List of Roman theatres
