= Roman Amphitheatre of Florence =

Ancient Roman amphitheater in Florence, Italy

Coordinates: 43°46′9.47″N 11°15′35.10″E

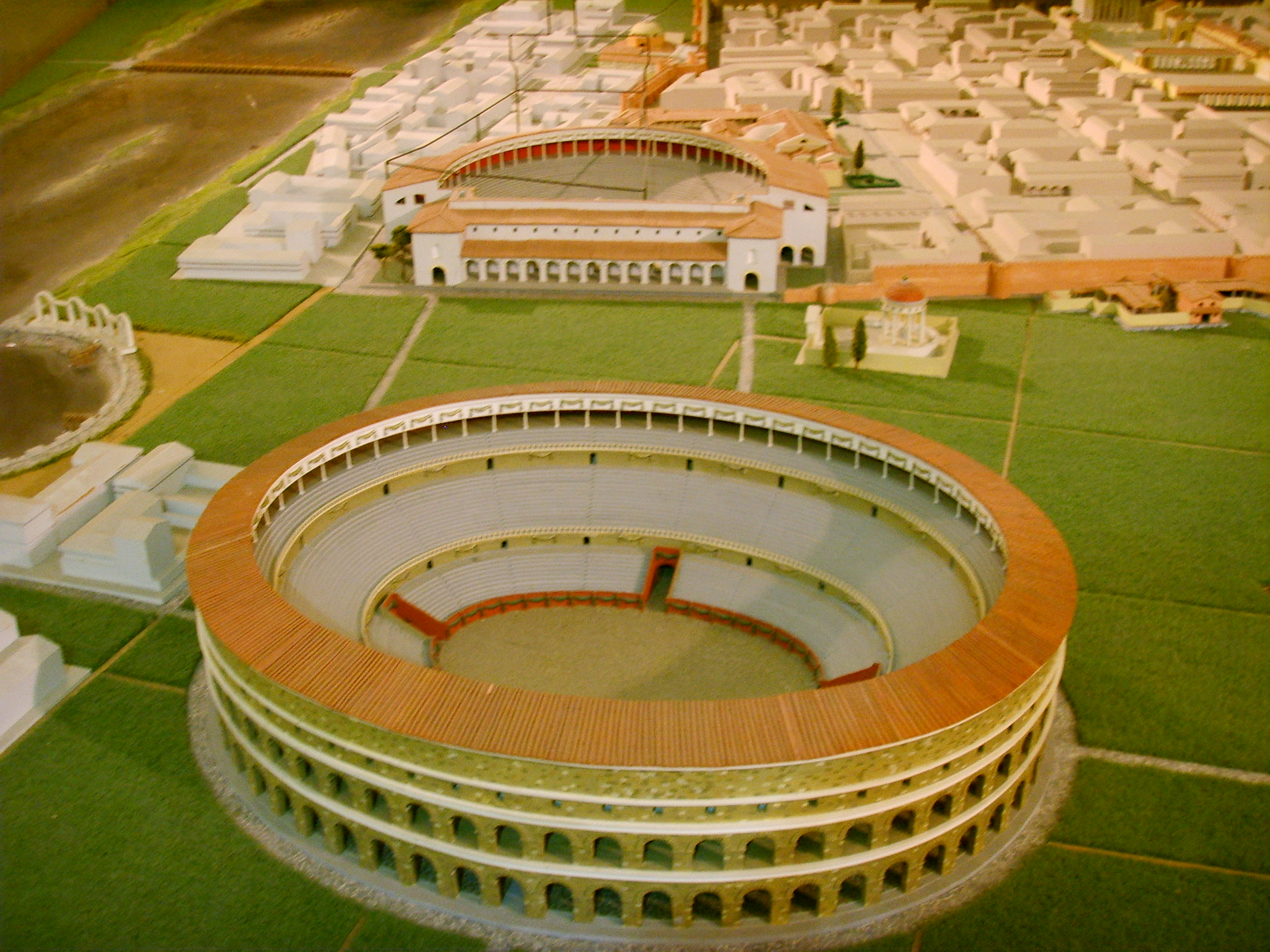
Model of the Roman amphitheatre in the Florence Museum

The Roman Amphitheatre of Florence was a Roman amphitheatre in Florence, Central Italy. It was located between Piazza dei Peruzzi, Via De' Bentaccordi, and Via Torta; its remains are visible in Via De' Bentaccordi. Closed during the Covid-19, the ruins re-opened for tours in December 2025.

When it was built between 124 and 130 AD, it was located outside the walls of Florentia and it marked the point of maximum expansion east. It had an elliptical shape with a diameter of 126 meters, with a capacity of about 20,000 seats (compared to 87,000 in the Flavian Amphitheatre in Rome). It was incorporated into other buildings during the medieval period. It has not been systematically excavated, but occasional discoveries have been made, such as in 1887.

In the second half of the 19th century, the area was at risk of being demolished during the work of the so-called Rehabilitation of Florence, to build a grand avenue between the Piazza della Signoria and Piazza Santa Croce, but the plan was never realized. A reconstruction of the amphitheatre in the Roman era and some related works are located in the Museo di Firenze com'era.

== See also ==
- List of Roman amphitheatres
