= Rinaldo degli Albizzi =

Italian nobleman

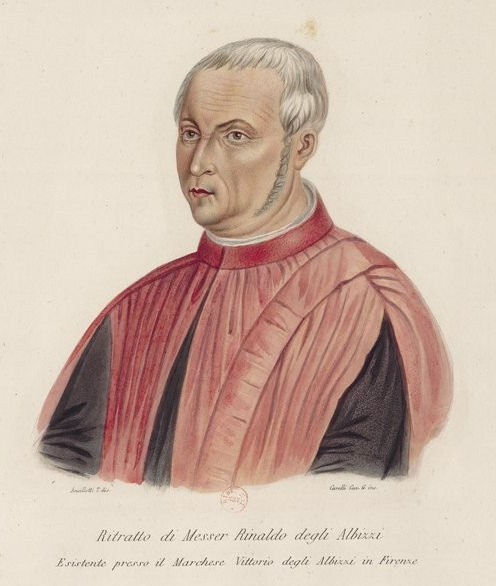

- Coat of arms
- Born: 1370; Republic of Florence
- Died: 1442 (aged 71–72); Ancona
- Noble family: Albizzi
- Spouse: Alessandra de' Ricco
- Issue: 12
- Father: Maso degli Albizzi

Rinaldo degli Albizzi (1370–1442) was an Italian nobleman, a member of the Florentine family of the Albizzi. Along with Palla Strozzi, he was the primary opponent of Cosimo de' Medici's rise in Florence.

Albizzi entered public service for the Republic of Florence in 1399 as a diplomat under the oligarchic rule of his father, Maso degli Albizzi. His brother, Luca di Maso degli Albizzi, married Aurelia de' Medici, daughter of Nicola de Medici (b.1384), son of Vieri de Medici and Bice Strozzi. He served on several dozen official diplomatic missions, first locally in towns such as Arezzo and Cortona, later on more distant assignments to Pisa, Lucca, Naples, and Rome. At the height of his diplomatic career, he was the principal ambassador for Florence, and was particularly active in ecclesiastic affairs.

On his father's death in 1417, Albizzi became the unofficial second-in-command of the oligarchy under his father's longtime friend, Niccolo da Uzzano. He eventually assumed leadership when Uzzano died in 1431.

After Volterra revolted against Florence in 1428, Rinaldo degli Albizzi was sent to "reacquire" the city from the rebels led by Giovanni di Contugi and his fellow magistrates. Afterward, Rinaldo incited Niccolò Fortebraccio to "attack the Lucchese under cover of some fictitious quarrel," an action that led Florence to attempt the conquest of Lucca. During this campaign, Albizzi served as War Commissioner under the Ten of War. However, after he was accused of trying to enrich himself by sacking conquered territory, he was removed from his position and recalled to Florence.

Later, in 1433, Albizzi convinced several prominent nobles to strike out against Cosimo de' Medici, who he feared was becoming too powerful. Eventually, Albizzi helped Bernardo Guadagni, a candidate for a position among the Signori, to pay off his debts, which had disqualified him from seeking office. Guadagni then won the position of Gonfaloniere of Justice. Through Guadagni, Albizzi summoned Cosimo to the palace, where he was captured. After a short trial, Cosimo was sentenced to 20 years' exile from Florence, although Albizzi sought the death penalty.

However, with the downturn of Florentine fortunes during the war with Milan, Cosimo returned with popular acclamation barely a year later, and Rinaldo degli Albizzi was in his turn exiled. Although he tried several times to convince the Duke of Milan, Filippo Maria Visconti, to intervene and restore him to power in Florence, his hopes ended in 1440 with the Florentine victory at the Battle of Anghiari.

Albizzi died at Ancona in 1442 after a trip to Jerusalem.

== Issue ==
Rinaldo married in 1392 Alessandra de' Ricco. They had twelve children, eight sons and four daughters:

- Ormanno degli Albizzi (1398 – after 1457), ambassador and military;
- Maso degli Albizzi (1400–1467), podestà;
- Francesco degli Albizzi (1402–1463), monk;
- Tobia degli Albizzi (1403–?), religious;
- Silvestro degli Albizzi (1407–?), monk;
- Giovanni degli Albizzi (1412–1433);
- Margherita degli Albizzi, she married Gherardo Gambacorti;
- Felice degli Albizzi, monk;
- Susanna degli Albizzi, she married Bartolomeo Nelli;
- Dragotto degli Albizzi;
- Nicoletta degli Albizzi, she married Giovanni degli Agli;
- Selvaggia degli Albizzi, she married Francesco Mancini.

== Fictional depictions ==
In Roberto Rossellini's three-part miniseries The Age of the Medici (1973), Rinaldo degli Albizzi was portrayed by Hungarian actor Tom Felleghy.

In Frank Spotnitz's eight-part television series Medici: Masters of Florence (2016), Albizzi was portrayed by English actor Lex Shrapnel.
