= Guadagni =

Guadagni is a surname. Notable people with the surname include:

- Bernardo Guadagni (1361–1434), Gonfalonier of Justice
- Gaetano Guadagni (1728–1792), Italian mezzo-soprano castrato singer
- Giovanni Antonio Guadagni (1674–1759), Italian Roman Catholic cardinal
- Nicky Guadagni (born 1952), Canadian actress

== See also ==
- Guadagnino, surname
- Guadagno, surname
- Palazzo Guadagni Strozzi Sacrati, palace in Tuscany
