= Ormanno degli Albizzi =

Italian noble, ambassador and military

- Arms of Albizzi family
- Born: 7 March 1398; Republic of Florence
- Died: 1457 or after
- Noble family: Albizzi
- Spouse: Leonarda Frescobaldi
- Issue: Bartolomeo degli Albizzi; Piero degli Albizzi; Francesco degli Albizzi; Maria degli Albizzi; Tobia degli Albizzi; Rinaldo degli Albizzi
- Father: Rinaldo degli Albizzi
- Mother: Alessandra de' Ricco

Ormanno di Rinaldo degli Albizzi (7 March 1398, Florence - 1457 or after) was an Italian (Republic of Florence) ambassador and military, firstborn of Rinaldo degli Albizzi and his wife Alessandra de' Ricco.

== Biography ==
He was sent in 1433 as ambassador to Venice. In 1434 he was at the side of his father Rinaldo to oppose at the return of the exiled Cosimo de' Medici, but they failed and Cosimo came back to Florence, whom he became the unofficial Lord.

After the restoration of the Medici rulership, Rinaldo degli Albizi was exiled. Two years later Ormanno was declared a rebel and exiled too, and he fled to Trapani. Later in the same year he went to Milan at the court of Filippo Maria Visconti to incite him against the Florence and served under the Visconti insignia until the battle of Anghiari, lost by Milan. He spent a few years at the Gonzaga court in Mantua before moving to Gaeta with King Alfonso V of Aragon. He sent ambassadors to Florence in 1455 and 1457 with the intention to obtain permission to return, but Cosimo de' Medici was adamant in confirming his exile. From 1457 there was no more news of him.

== Issue ==
Ormanno married in 1420 Leonarda Frescobaldi. They had six children, five sons and a daughter:

- Bartolomeo degli Albizzi (d. c. 1461);
- Piero degli Albizzi (b. 1423);
- Francesco degli Albizzi (b. 1426), monk;
- Maria degli Albizzi (1428 - c. 1470), nun, scribe and manuscript illustrator. She is remembered for being the first known female artist to make her own self-portrait;
- Tobia degli Albizzi;
- Rinaldo degli Albizzi.

== In media ==
- In the first season of italian TV series Medici, Ormanno is played by the Italian actor Eugenio Franceschini. In the series, he is the only child of his parents and he hasn't wife or issue. He is exiled by Cosimo de' Medici together with his father in 1434 and the two die just outside Florence in suspicious circumstances.

== Sources ==
- Pompeo Litta, Albizzi di Firenze, in Famiglie celebri italiane, Milano, 1835.
