= Albizzi =

Italian family

- Patrician noble family
- Country: Republic of Florence; Duchy of Florence; Grand Duchy of Tuscany; Kingdom of Italy
- Founded: Before circa 1000 by a German knight of the suite of Otto III (crowned emperor by 996 in Rome)
- Founder: Raimondino of Arezzo
- Current head: None; extinct by early 20th c. with Leonia degli Albizzi
- Final head: Vittorio degli Albizzi
- Dissolution: 1877
- Cadet branches: List: Alessandri (dissident)

The Albizzi family (Italian pronunciation: [ˈalbittsi]) was an Italian noble family and were the de-facto leaders of an oligarchy of wealthy families that ruled Florence in the second half of the 14th century. They were at the center of the oligarchy from 1382, in the reaction that followed the Ciompi revolt, to the rise of the Medici in 1434.

One of the most powerful families of medieval Florence, the Albizzi were active members of the wool guild Arte della Lana and were most prosperous between the 13th and 16th centuries. The Albizzi were known for their opposition to the Medici family and their significant role in the city's political and social life.

== Origin and professions ==
The Albizzi moved to Florence from Arezzo sometime in the 12th century, and rose to power during the 14th century through their increasing influence over Florentine politics and bureaucratic offices, and their multiple businesses. The family held a strong position in the wool guild, often contributing to shaping the guild's governing policies and laws. Guild records have also shown the Albizzi to be among the most active in the governing of the Arte della Lana, as shown by the significant number of its members in the guild's cabinet (21 in the year 1332 and 18 in the year 1353). By the beginning of the Trecento, the Albizzi had established themselves as one of the most prominent families of Florentine nobility, owing to their success as merchants and financiers.

The Albizzi family's main business was the production, refinement, and commerce of wool. While they did trade in and around Florence, their most prolific markets were Venice, Flanders, and England. The business was run in a fondaco (warehouse) and two bottege (shops). In addition to producing and selling cloth, the Albizzi also started granting loans to other families and businesses and sold and rented land, fulling mills, and factories located in Tuscany. The Albizzi were also directly involved in governing Florence and in particular their own neighborhood.

== Rise to Florentine leadership ==
By the 1360s, two rival factions had emerged in Florence: the Albizzi family, who supported and favored alliances with the Papacy and Naples, and the Ricci family, who pushed for more representation for the common people. These factions fought until 1372, when the Signoria banned the Albizzi from holding public office for five years. During this ban, Maso degli Albizzi, a prominent member of the family, was removed from his position in Pistoia, a region controlled by Florence. However, his setback was brief. After the Ciompi Revolt ended in 1382, Maso returned to power.

The Albizzi family regained control of the city after a difficult and often violent period. This turmoil followed the War of the Eight Saints (1375–1378), a failed military campaign against the Papacy that drained Florence's finances and imposed harsh religious penalties on the population, leading to widespread dissatisfaction with the government. In the aftermath of the Ciompi Revolt, an oligarchic regime took over Florence. This regime, dominated by the city's wealthy patricians who controlled both commerce and government decisions, was led by Maso degli Albizzi.

== Cultural and artistic impact ==
During the Albizzi rule after the Ciompi riots, promotions and other forms of sponsorship played an important role in strengthening their influence in Florence. In particular, from 1382 to 1392, ceremonies and events such as chivalric-courtly celebrations were arranged by the Albizzi to boost their public image and social relations with other powerful families. After 1390, however, they increasingly included joust and tournaments, although these were less common. Another way the Albizzi established strong political connections was by welcoming important guests into their private homes. These guests were given special treatment, often watching events from prime spots like church steps or windows, or even participating as spectators or contenders, all while being comfortably accommodated nearby.

One of the greatest reasons for the Albizzi's popularity lies in the famed portrait of Giovanna degli Albizzi Tornabuoni by the artist Domenico Ghirlandaio. Giovanna's portraits became an iconic paradigm of Renaissance art, thus exemplifying the Albizzi family's, including Giovanna's, role in supporting the arts, contributing to Florence's cultural legacy.

== Prominent members ==
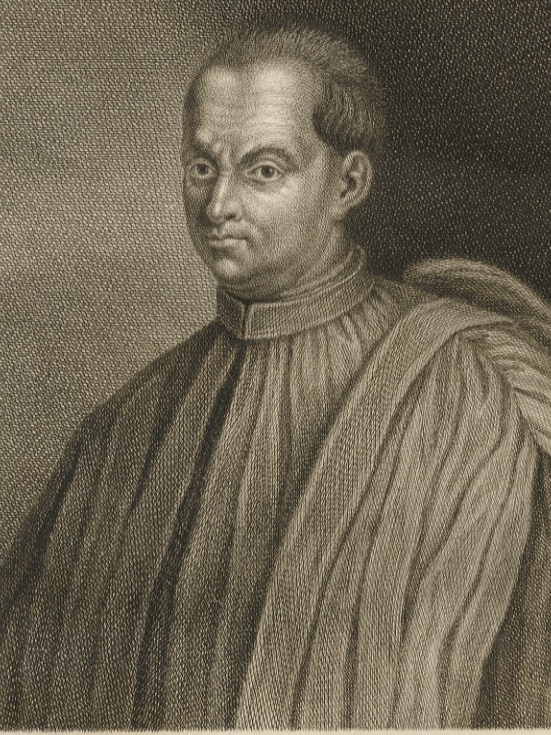
Maso degli Albizzi

Tommaso (Maso) degli Albizzi (1347–1417) was a Florentine statesman and the leader of the post-1382 oligarchic regime of the Florentine Republic. Maso degli Albizzi whose leadership and authority were unchallenged at that time, was also the man who masterminded the Pisan operation in 1406. Maso degli Albizzi, first experienced political defeat when he was ousted from his political position in Pistoia. However, Maso returned to the Signoria after the Ciompi Revolt ended in 1382.

Maso is considered a perceptive politician renowned for his charm, charisma, and diplomatic elegance. Maso and his fellow patricians undid the egalitarian changes made during the Ciompi era and restored a system that gave higher guildsmen more power and a majority in committees. After Maso died in 1417, his son Rinaldo degli Albizzi took control of the city before his exile.

Rinaldo degli Albizzi (1370–1442) was the elder son of Maso degli Albizzi. Rinaldo was trained to be a soldier and a diplomat and his main goals were to keep the oligarchy in the Albizzi's hands. When his father died in 1417, Rinaldo took his place as the head of the Albizzi family and started a war to conquer Lucca. But this enterprise was more difficult than he thought and cost Florence heavily. Rinaldo is most well-known for his enmity with the Medici family, particularly Cosimo the Elder. In 1433, Cosimo de’ Medici was summoned by the Signoria, where Rinaldo tried to persuade them to behead Cosimo on the false accusation of getting foreign help against Florence. However, he was opposed by the majority in the Signoria and was forced to agree to Cosimo's banishment instead of death.

In the meantime, Rinaldo was losing support in Florence, and a difficult war against Milan added to his unpopularity. When Cosimo returned to Florence, he was lenient on Rinaldo and exiled him and his supporters with the help of the Signoria. After his exile, Rinaldo allied with Milan and conspired against Florence. In response, the Medicean Signoria denounced Rinaldo. He died in Ancona in 1442.

Luca degli Albizzi [it] was the younger son of Maso degli Albizzi and the head of the Florentine galleys. During the years of the Medici-Albizzi conflict, Luca always sided with the Medici. Due to his allegiance to Cosimo, he was allowed to stay in Florence after his family's exile in 1434. Luca soon became Cosimo's right-hand man and was sent as ambassador to Milan, Rome, and Venice. He became the Gonfaloniere of Justice in 1442 and, occasionally, a member of the Council of Ten.

Ormanno degli Albizzi was the son of Rinaldo degli Albizzi. In 1433, he was sent as ambassador to Venice. In 1434 he and his father opposed Cosimo's return after exile, but they failed and Cosimo returned to Florence. Two years after Rinaldo's exile, Ormanno was declared a rebel and exiled too, and he fled to Trapani. Later he went to Milan at the court of Filippo Maria Visconti to incite him against Florence. He sent ambassadors to Florence in 1455 and 1457 to obtain permission to return, but Cosimo de' Medici was adamant in confirming his exile. From 1457 there was no more news of him.

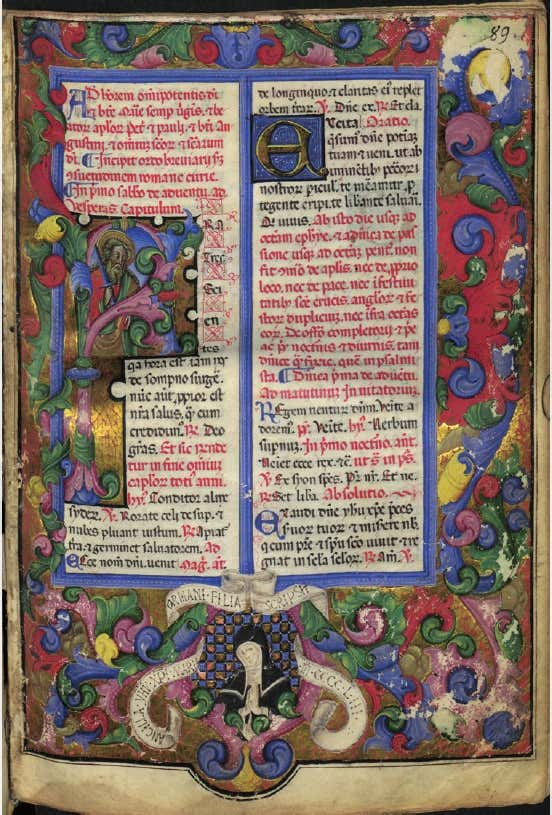
Maria Ormani's Breviary Manuscript Page with self-portrait

Maria Ormani (born Maria di Ormanno degli Albizzi; 1428–1470), was an Augustinian Hermit nun-scribe and manuscript illustrator. She was the daughter of Ormanno degli Albizzi. Maria did not accompany her family into exile but became a novice at San Gaggio in 1438. Maria lived here with daughters of other patrician families including the Medici, Orsini, and Rinuccini until sometime before 1471 when she disappeared from lists of convent residents. Maria di Ormanno degli Albizzi's most notable work is a self-portrait in a breviary that she signed and dated 1453.

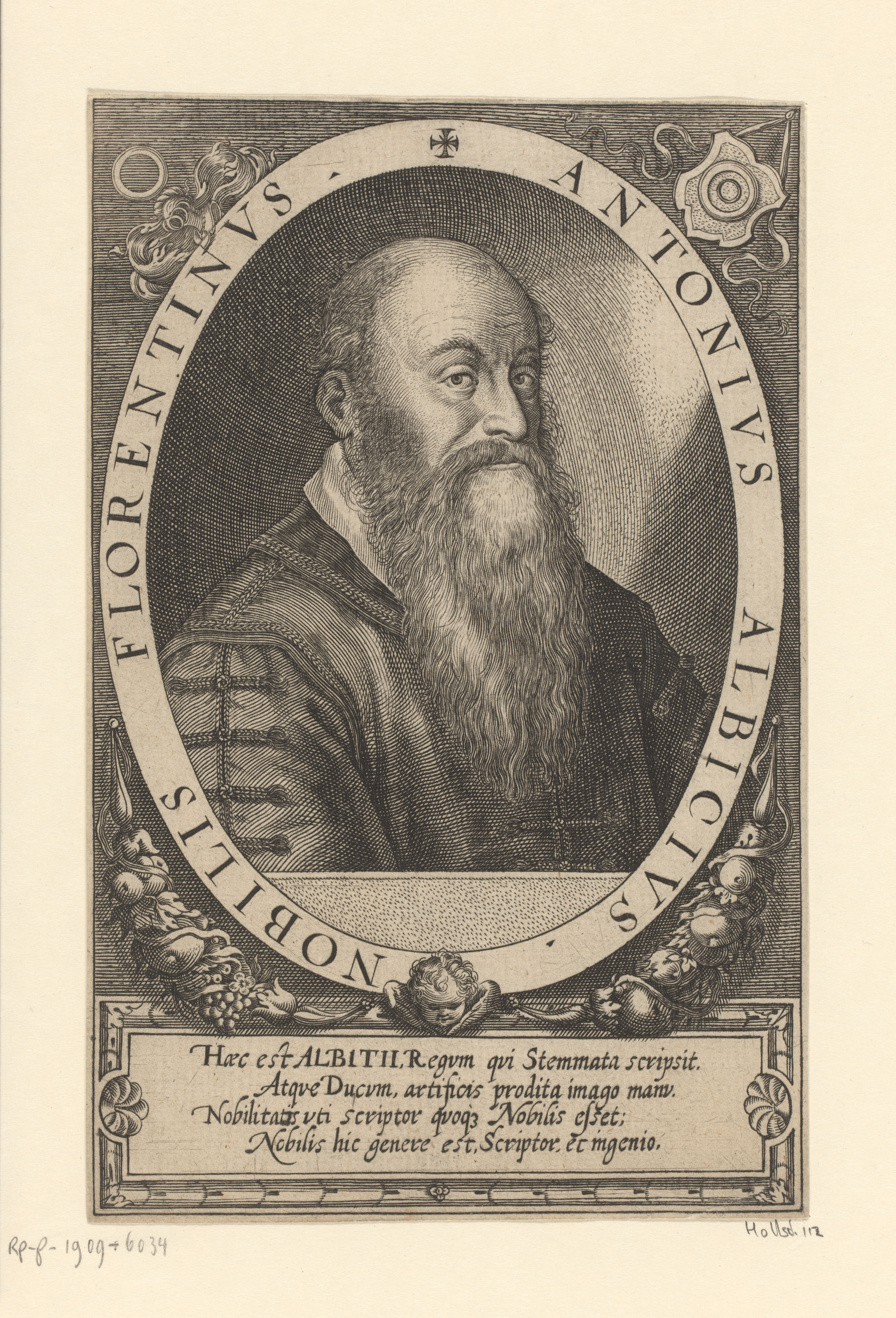
Antonio Albizzi

Antonio degli Albizzi (1547–1627) completed his studies in Pisa and became the regent of the Accademia degli Alterati. His life was marked by significant intellectual and political activity, as well as a notable conversion to Lutheranism that set him apart from many of his contemporaries. As a young man, Albizzi authored writings on Dante, composed Carnival poems, and penned a biography of Pietro Strozzi. In 1576, Antonio entered the service of Andreas von Habsburg, a young cardinal and member of the Habsburg family, and served as Andreas' secretary, counselor, and camerarius aulicus. Antonio's conversion to Lutheranism occurred around 1585 during his time as the Habsburg commissary in Carniola (Slovenia). The conversion was reportedly triggered by an illness and a Jesuit reading Paul's letters to him.

Despite his conversion, Antonio maintained a low profile, practicing Nicodemism—a secret adherence to Protestant beliefs while outwardly participating in Catholic rituals to avoid persecution. After the death of Cardinal Andreas in 1600, Antonio relocated to Kempten, a Lutheran town, to avoid the jurisdiction of the Catholic Inquisition. Here, he lived out his remaining years, contributing to the local community as a political advisor, philanthropist, and supporter of the parish school. Albizzi authored several Lutheran theological works, including the "Exercitationes theologicae" (1616–1617), a detailed exposition of Lutheran doctrine. Antonio degli Albizzi died in 1627.

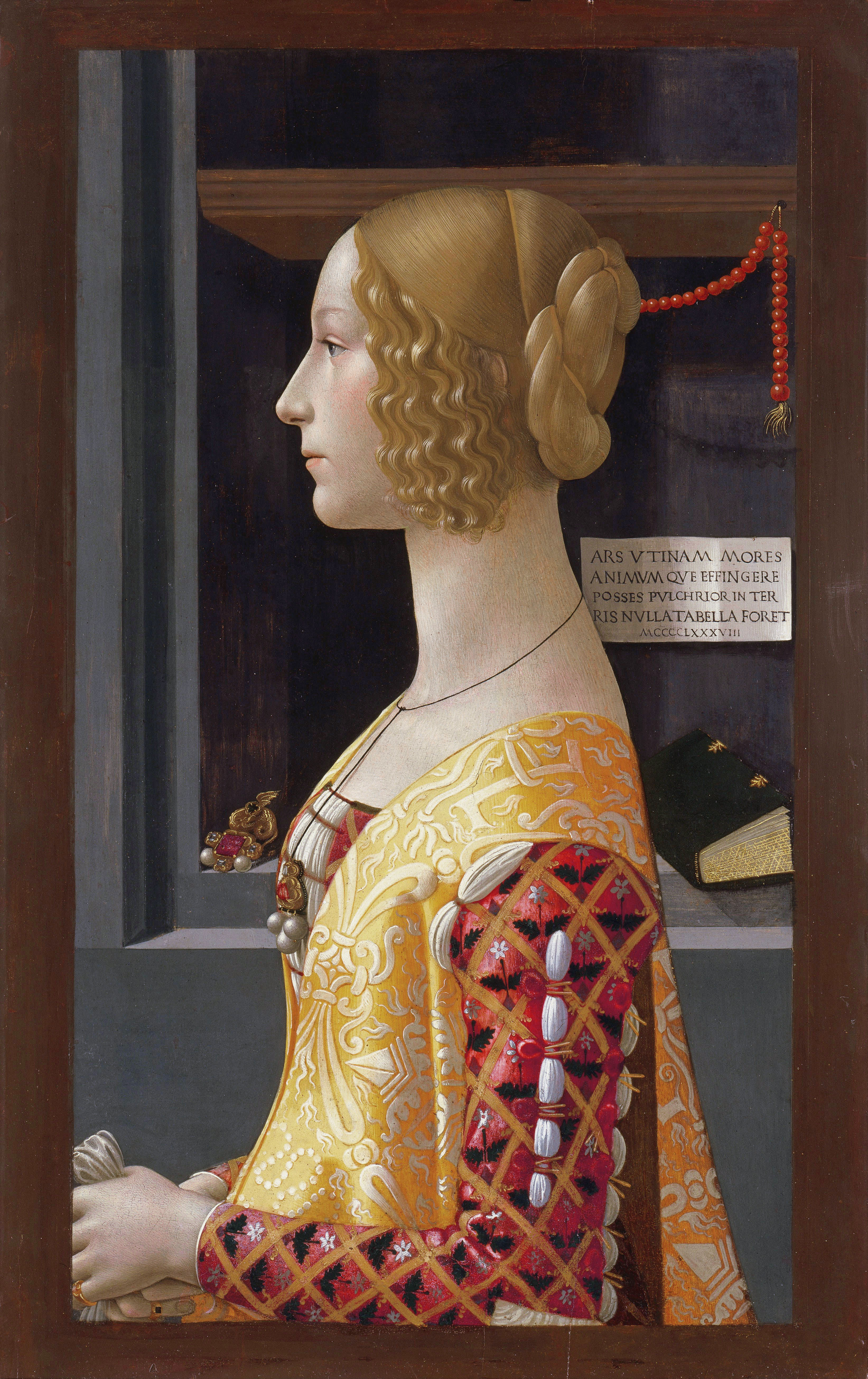
Portrait of Giovanna degli Albizzi Tornabuoni

Giovanna degli Albizzi Tornabuoni (1468–1488) was born in Florence. In 1486, at the age of 20, Giovanna married Lorenzo Tornabuoni. Giovanna's life was cut short when she died in 1488, likely due to complications related to childbirth. Giovanna is most famously depicted in a portrait by the renowned Florentine painter Domenico Ghirlandaio. Despite her brief life, Giovanna left a mark on Renaissance art and culture through her portraits. Giovanna is also depicted in Ghirlandaio's frescoes in the Tornabuoni Chapel in Santa Maria Novella, Florence. In these frescoes, she is shown in scenes such as the Visitation, where her image serves as a memorial following her death.

Lucrezia di Matteo Albizzi Ricasoli was a Florentine patrician woman born likely in the last decade of the 15th century. Her father was Matteo di Andrea degli Albizzi, and her mother was Nanna di Niccolò Tornabuoni. In 1513, Lucrezia married Filippo di Piergiovanni Ricasoli. After her husband's death, Lucrezia did not remarry and managed her household as a widow. Lucrezia had at least six children, including Matteo, Braccio, Maddalena, Piergiovanni, Alessandra, and Raffaello. Her correspondence primarily involved letters to her sons, particularly Matteo and Braccio.

As a widow, Lucrezia played an active role in the family business, coordinating the dispatch and sale of agricultural products, reporting to her sons, and managing the family's finances. Her letters often reveal her frustrations with the financial difficulties her family faced, particularly with maintaining appearances and managing debts. Lucrezia likely began writing letters in her own hand relatively late in life, around the late 1530s, possibly in her forties. Before this, she mostly relied on delegate writers to compose letters on her behalf. Her first known autograph letter dates to 1539.

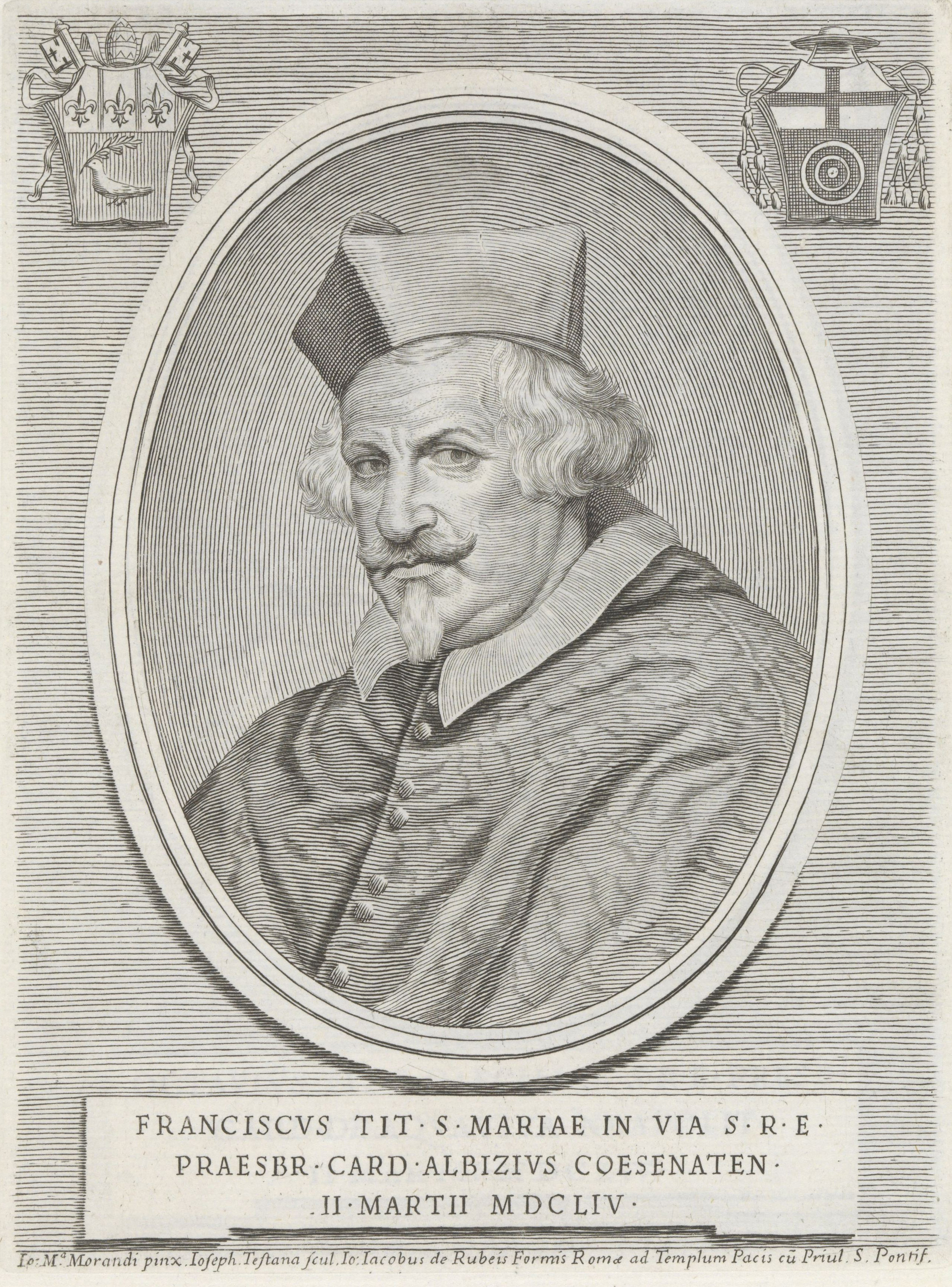
Francesco Albizzi

Francesco Albizzi (1593, Cesena – 1684, Rome) was a cardinal. As a member of the Roman Inquisition, he worked to increase the standards of jurisprudence in Rome and establish "rigorous standards of evidence and proof", particularly concerning alleged cases of witchcraft. At 90 years old, Francesco Albizzi died in Rome in 1683.

Eleonora degli Albizzi (1543–1634) was the daughter of Luigi degli Albizzi and Nannina Soderini. With the consent of her father, by 1565, she became the mistress of Cosimo I de' Medici, the Grand duke of Tuscany. In 1567 she had an illegitimate son with the Duke, Don Giovanni de' Medici. She died in 1634.

Filippo degli Albizzi was a Florentine naturalist from the 18th century on behalf of whom Albizia julibrissin was named.
