= Bernardo Guadagni =

Bernardo Guadagni (1361–1434) was twice elected Gonfalonier of Justice (President of the Republic of Florence). During his second term, he had his powerful rival Cosimo de' Medici arrested, imprisoned and sent to exile for five years. The Guadagni and the Medici families were wealthy banking families in Renaissance Florence Italy.

Guadagni was played by Brian Cox in the scripted television drama, Medici: Masters of Florence. Ahistorically, however, Guadagni is portrayed more positively and honorably as the "mediator" between the Medici and Albizzi factions--only signing on Cosimo's exile due to the Albizzi's bullying and tacitly supporting the Medici's return afterwards.
