= Medici (TV series) =

2016 Italian-British TV series

- Also known as: Medici: Masters of Florence (season 1); Medici: The Magnificent (seasons 2–3)
- Genre: Historical drama
- Created by: Frank Spotnitz; Nicholas Meyer
- Starring: Season 1: Richard Madden; Stuart Martin; Annabel Scholey; Guido Caprino; Alessandro Sperduti; Valentina Bellè; Alessandro Preziosi; Eugenio Franceschini; Sarah Felberbaum; Miriam Leone; Valentina Cervi; Brian Cox; Dustin Hoffman; Seasons 2–3: Daniel Sharman; Bradley James; Sarah Parish; Alessandra Mastronardi; Matteo Martari; Aurora Ruffino; Matilda Lutz; Filippo Nigro; Annabel Scholey; Sean Bean; Raoul Bova; Francesco Montanari; Johnny Harris; Sebastian de Souza; Callum Blake; Jack Roth; Toby Regbo; Synnøve Karlsen
- Opening theme: "Renaissance" by Paolo Buonvino & Skin (s. 1) "Revolution Bones" by Paolo Buonvino & Skin (s. 2–3)
- Composers: Paolo Buonvino; Ian Arber (s. 2–3)
- Countries of origin: Italy; United Kingdom
- Original language: English
- No. of series: 3
- No. of episodes: 24 (list of episodes)

Production
- Executive producers: Frank Spotnitz; Luca Bernabei; Matilde Bernabei; Richard Madden (seasons 2–3)
- Producer: Fania Petrocchi
- Running time: 52 minutes
- Production companies: Lux Vide; Big Light Productions; Rai Fiction

Original release
- Network: Rai 1
- Release: 18 October 2016 – 11 December 2019

Medici (Italian: I Medici) is an Italian-British historical drama television series created by Frank Spotnitz and Nicholas Meyer. The series was produced by Italian companies Lux Vide and Rai Fiction, in collaboration with Spotnitz's Big Light Productions. The series follows the House of Medici, bankers of the Pope, in 15th-century Florence. Each season follows the events of a particular moment of the family's history exploring the political and artistic landscape of Renaissance Italy.

The first season of the series, titled Medici: Masters of Florence, premiered in Italy on Rai 1 on 18 October 2016. It takes place in 1429, the year Giovanni de' Medici, head of the family, died. His son Cosimo succeeds him as head of the family bank, the richest in Europe, and fights to preserve his power in Florence. The series reached between four and eight million viewers on original airings. According to Italian ratings compiler Auditel, the broadcast of the first episode attracted a record 8.04 million viewers.

The second season, titled Medici: The Magnificent, takes place 35 years later and tells the story of Cosimo's grandson Lorenzo de' Medici. It premiered on Rai 1 in 2018, while a third season, which completes the story of Lorenzo, followed in 2019. The series is broadcast in 190 countries, including on Netflix in the US, Canada, the UK, Ireland and India, and on SBS in Australia.

== Plot ==
=== Season 1 ===
Florence, 1429. Giovanni de' Medici is a rich banker who also represents one of the most important political forces of Florence's Signoria. He has a plan to increase his family's power by making an agreement with the Church of Rome. The election of a new pope is about to take place and Giovanni sends his sons Cosimo and Lorenzo to Rome to encourage the election of a pope close to his family. In Rome, Cosimo, fascinated by the beauty of ancient architecture and art, meets Donatello and one of his models Bianca. Cosimo falls in love with her but is then forced to leave her and marry Contessina de Bardi, a political marriage arranged by Giovanni and Contessina's father. The Medici candidate is elected, which assures the bank of the Medici of unparalleled economic power.

Twenty years later, Giovanni is mysteriously murdered and Cosimo and Lorenzo try secretly to investigate his death. The political situation in the city is troubled by plots against Medici power, and their vision of the future of Florence—which will then lead to the Renaissance—is in danger. Cosimo's dream is to complete the Duomo of Florence, but no architect seems to have a feasible solution due to the shape of the base created for the cathedral. Finally, Filippo Brunelleschi introduces himself to Cosimo and shows him plans for the dome. Cosimo decides to trust Brunelleschi and the construction of the cathedral starts, bringing jobs and people to Florence. Meanwhile, the mystery surrounding the death of Giovanni thickens and Rinaldo Albizzi, Cosimo's main opponent in the Signoria, tries to block the construction and to incite the people to rise up against the Medicis.

=== Season 2 ===
Twenty years have passed since the events of the first season. Piero, Cosimo's son, and his wife Lucrezia are now at the head of the family. The power of the Medici has consolidated over time, but an assassination attempt on Piero brings to light his mismanagement of the family bank. The Sforza family are the largest debtors of the bank, but come to an agreement with Piero to erase it. The solution proposed by Sforza would also bring about the invasion of Florence. To prevent this, Piero's son Lorenzo takes over the role of his father both in the government of the Signoria and as head of the family. Although he has a relationship with a married woman, Lucrezia Donati, Lorenzo accepts marriage to a religious Roman noblewoman, Clarice Orsini (who initially wanted to be a nun but is obliged to give up her dream for the marriage). Their marriage goes through a turbulent time as their interests differ, but he soon falls in love with her and they start living happily. His brother Giuliano and his dear friend Sandro Botticelli both meet and fall in love with Simonetta, although in different ways. Botticelli's interest is an artistic one and leads to the painting of Venus and Mars in which Simonetta is represented alongside Giuliano. The Pazzi family, led by Jacopo Pazzi and his nephew Francesco, join forces with the Pope to increase the Church's control of nearby territories and mines, in opposition to the Medici's policy. This argument will eventually lead to a conspiracy against Lorenzo in an attempt to put an end to his power and his dream of a peaceful and culturally alive Florence.

=== Season 3 ===
This season starts eight years after the previous one. With his brother's death and the counsel of his new ruthless advisor Bruno Bernardi, Lorenzo has grown into a cruel determined man and vows revenge. He soon has three children with Clarice (and eventually a miscarried child as well that leads to Clarice's death), and they also raise Giulio (Giuliano's illegitimate son) after his father's death. Following the breakdown of the Pazzi conspiracy, Lorenzo must still face a military coalition from the Papal States and the Kingdom of Naples, with the Papal Army led by the Pope's ambitious nephew, Girolamo Riario. Lorenzo undertakes a diplomatic journey to Naples and succeeds in negotiating a separate peace. However, Father Girolamo Savonarola gradually challenges the Medici for power in Florence. Season 3 focuses on how Lorenzo would do anything, to any extent for his family and his legacy.

== Episodes ==
Series	English subtitle	Italian subtitle	Episodes	Originally released	
Series	English subtitle	Italian subtitle	Episodes	First released	Last released
1	Masters of Florence	—	8	18 October 2016	8 November 2016
2	The Magnificent, Part 1	Lorenzo il Magnifico	8	23 October 2018	13 November 2018
3	The Magnificent, Part 2	Nel nome della famiglia	8	2 December 2019	11 December 2019

=== Season 1 (2016) ===
No. overall	No. in season	Title	Italian Title	Directed by	Written by	Original release date	Italy viewers (millions)
1	1	"Original Sin"	"Peccato originale"	Sergio Mimica-Gezzan	Story by : Frank Spotnitz & Nicholas Meyer; Teleplay by : Nicholas Meyer	18 October 2016	8.04
In 1429, when the Medici patriarch Giovanni di Bicci de' Medici is poisoned, his first son Cosimo takes over the family bank and asks Marco Bello to investigate the murder. Cosimo is elected to his father's seat on the Signoria, where Rinaldo degli Albizzi, the family's rival, is pushing for war with Milan because they attacked Lucca. Twenty years earlier, Giovanni had sent Cosimo and his younger brother Lorenzo to Rome with bribes to install a friendly cardinal as Pope (Antipope John XXIII) and gain control of the Vatican's banking. Cosimo, who wants to be an artist, meets Donatello and falls in love with his beautiful model Bianca, but when Giovanni finds out, he shuts down the studio and drives Bianca away.
2	2	"The Dome and the Domicile"	"La cupola e la dimora"	Sergio Mimica-Gezzan	Frank Spotnitz & Nicholas Meyer	18 October 2016	7.14
The war with Milan and it took a toll on Florence's economy. Cosimo funds Filippo Brunelleschi to build a dome for the cathedral creating work and brokers a deal between Lucca and the Duke of Milan for peace. Twenty years earlier, Giovanni forces Cosimo to marry Contessina, the strong-willed daughter of a noble banker with financial problems, forcing Cosimo to give up his dreams of being an artist.
3	3	"Pestilence"	"La peste"	Sergio Mimica-Gezzan	Sophie Petzal	25 October 2016	6.73
Florence is hit by the Black Plague and Cosimo moves the family to the safety of their estate outside the city. Albizzi turns the people against Cosimo and his dome blaming the plague on God's wrath at the Medici's usury. Cosimo returns to Florence and turns the cathedral into a hospice for plague victims, and workers refuses to demolish it, saving the dome. Lorenzo overrules Contessina and sells the family's wool business making their financial problems public. Albizzi has Cosimo arrested after Marco breaks into a house to gather evidence on Giovanni's murder. Twenty years earlier, Cosimo and Contessina struggle to trust each other and make their marriage work.
4	4	"Judgment Day"	"Il giorno del giudizio"	Sergio Mimica-Gezzan	Alex von Tunzelmann	25 October 2016	6.32
Albizzi accuses Cosimo of usury and trying to overthrow the republic. Twenty years earlier, Cosimo befriended Albizzi, who tells him that his family lost a valuable ship at sea and Giovanni uses the information to have Albizzi's father declared bankrupt and thrown off the Signoria. Piero and Contessina try to mount a defense but Cosimo is sentenced to death. Lorenzo buys the Sforza army and threatens to invade Florence. Contessina storms the Signoria on horseback and persuades them to exile Cosimo to prevent war.
5	5	"Temptation"	"La tentazione"	Sergio Mimica-Gezzan	Francesca Gardiner	1 November 2016	6.50
Albizzi hires mercenaries and exiles the Medici's allies to gain control of Florence. Contessina turns down an offer to flee Florence with her old lover, whom she was forced to abandon when she was betrothed to Cosimo. In Venice, Cosimo lobbies the Doge to back his return to Florence, and with information supplied by Contessina, thwarts Albizzi's attempt to make an alliance through marriage. The Doge gives Cosimo a beautiful slave named Maddelena, whom he teaches to draw and then falls for. Albizzi tries to seize the Signoria but he is betrayed by Pazzi and arrested.
6	6	"Ascendancy"	"Predominio"	Sergio Mimica-Gezzan	Jonny Stockwood & Mark Denton	1 November 2016	6.02
Cosimo is welcomed back to Florence and pays off the mercenaries who are terrorising the town because they haven't been paid. Cosimo finally makes up with Contessina and ends his relationship with Maddelena. The Pope Eugene IV seeks sanctuary with the Medici when Rome is attacked. At the Pope's urging, Cosimo persuades the Signoria to show mercy and exile Albizzi instead of executing him. While the Pope blesses Cosimo's cathedral, Albizzi and his son are murdered in the woods by the mercenaries.
7	7	"Purgatory"	"Il purgatorio"	Sergio Mimica-Gezzan	Emilia di Girolamo	8 November 2016	6.42
Cosimo has a local olive merchant elected to the Signoria to fill Albizzi's vacant seat, but the merchant is murdered and Pazzi is elected while Cosimo is absent. After Marco reveals that the apothecary was killed with Lorenzo's dagger, Cosimo has Lorenzo locked in his room. Marco kisses Maddelena causing tension with Cosimo. Ugo reveals that Rosa was carrying Lorenzo's child and Giovanni had her shipped off to a home for unmarried mothers where she and the baby died. Lorenzo claims Marco framed him to cover up his own involvement in Giovanni's murder, which Marco denies and Cosimo allows him to leave.
8	8	"Epiphany"	"L'epifania"	Sergio Mimica-Gezzan	John Fay	8 November 2016	6.26
Rumours of Cosimo's hand in Albizzi's murder result in the Pope transferring the church's banking to Pazzi. Cosimo heads to Rome with money to pay for an army to retake Rome for the Pope. Marco helps Lorenzo to capture Pazzi's assassin and obtain a letter that proves Pazzi's complicity. Pazzi's men kill Lorenzo and free the assassin but Cosimo gives the letter to the Pope and the Medici retain the church's banking. Maddelena is pregnant with Cosimo's child and Contessina decides that Cosimo will acknowledge and raise the bastard. Ugo murdered Giovanni because he ordered him to take Rosa away and she and her child ultimately died in the home to which he had taken her.

=== Season 2 (2018) ===
No. overall	No. in season	Title	Italian Title	Directed by	Written by	Original release date	Italy viewers (millions)
9	1	"Old Scores"	"Vecchi rancori"	Jon Cassar	Frank Spotnitz	23 October 2018	4.53
1469. Following years of stable power established by the late Cosimo, the Medici Bank, now led by the 50s-year-old Piero de' Medici, is in trouble. Piero is the target of a harrowing ambush; wounded, he is saved by his 20s-year-old sons Lorenzo and Giuliano, who accuse the family's nemesis Jacopo de' Pazzi of attempted murder. With the mounting tensions in the city, Piero requests the intervention of the army of one of his chief debtors, Galeazzo Maria Sforza, Duke of Milan.
10	2	"Standing Alone"	"Un uomo solo"	Jon Cassar	Alex von Tunzelmann	23 October 2018	3.82
Now head of the family, Lorenzo travels to Rome with his mother Lucrezia to gain the Pope's financial support or risk losing everything. But Jacopo Pazzi's cousin Francesco Salviati is a member of the Roman curia and works against them. Sandro Botticelli meets his muse in Simonetta Vespucci. To resolve the situation in Rome, Lucrezia works in the background to secure a marriage alliance between Lorenzo and Clarice Orsini, niece of a highly influential Cardinal, in return for her brother's appointment as Cardinal of Florence. Piero, ailing with gout, dies. A jousting contest takes place between the Pazzi and the Medici.
11	3	"Obstacles and Opportunities"	"Ostacoli e opportunità"	Jon Cassar	Mark Denton & Johnny Stockwood & James Dormer	30 October 2018	4.50
Following the death of Pope Paul II, the new pontiff Sixtus IV appoints the Pazzi cousin Salviati as Archbishop of Pisa, working against the Medici interests. Lorenzo and his brother travel to Milan to form closer ties with Sforza and secure trade for Florence. Jacopo Pazzi attempts to exploit the scandalous elopement of his nephew Guglielmo with Lorenzo's sister Bianca, in order to undermine the Signoria's approval of the alliance with Milan. Lorenzo trades away advantages in order to allow his sister to marry her love. A wedding feast is held following the arrival of Lorenzo's wife Clarice from Rome. Giuliano becomes involved with Simonetta Vespucci.
12	4	"Blood with Blood"	"Il prezzo del sangue"	Jon Cassar	Francesco Arlanch	30 October 2018	4.05
Bianca's wedding takes place. Clarice confronts Lorenzo's mistress and then Lorenzo. The mineral alum is discovered near Volterra, nominally within Florence's realm. Lorenzo strikes a deal with his Volterran friend Steffano Maffei to exploit and trade the discovery. Jacopo's insistence on wiping-out the Medici interferes with Lorenzo's deal with Francesco de' Pazzi to share the wealth of Volterra. Lorenzo proposes a marriage for his brother to allow an alliance with Venice, however Venice ends up looking elsewhere after Clarice intervenes. Volterran politics interfere in Lorenzo's plans when Maffei is murdered. Giuliano and a military contingent attack Volterra but the army cannot be contained and a slaughter takes place. Whilst there is rejoicing in Florence, Lorenzo and Giuliano are distressed by the turn of events. Lorenzo recognises the ally he has in Clarice.
13	5	"Ties That Bind"	"Legami"	Jan Michelini	Lulu Raczka & James Dormer	6 November 2018	4.03
It is a year later. Lorenzo and Clarice, their relationship much improved, celebrate the birth of their child, Piero, with Francesco as godfather. Bianca is pregnant. Lorenzo's alliance of friendship with Francesco Pazzi pays dividends, however this causes much conflict between Francesco and his uncle. Milan acquires the city of Imola. The senior Pazzi sees this as an opportunity to drive a wedge between the Pope and Lorenzo. The Sforza agree to sell Imola to Lorenzo, and Lorenzo wants first his brother and then Francesco as Florence's governor there. However the senior Pazzi's plotting through his cousin Salviati leads to the threat to excommunicate Milan if he does not sell Imola to the Papal States. Giuliano confesses his relationship with Simonetta was the reason for his refusal to accept the Imola post. The senior Pazzi seeks to use Francesco's wife as a wedge between Francesco and Lorenzo, and when Francesco investigates further the circumstances of Novella's arrival in the city, he sees her arrival as part of a Medici plot, and throws her out of his house. Vespucci suspects his wife is having an affair.
14	6	"Alliance"	"Alleanza"	Jan Michelini	Francesco Arlanch	6 November 2018	3.79
The Pazzi foment insurrection in nearby Città di Castello. Giuliano is distraught at the end of his affair and travels to Citta di Castello to try to quell the riots against Castello's leader. The Pope sees the situation there as a representation of all that is bad about the Medici's alliances, and seeks to bring order to the city. Both Pazzi and Lorenzo attempt to win broad support for their candidate to be the new Gonfaloniere of Florence. The struggle to win votes turns violent - Luca Soderini is murdered after vacillating regarding his vote when pressured by the Pazzi. Venice's envoy is upset after his daughter Novella is thrown-out of home by Francesco Pazzi, and this threatens Lorenzo's attempts to broker an alliance between Milan, Florence, and Venice to secure trade routes and interfere with the Pope's plans. Clarice attempts to lobby for her husband's candidate by again approaching her husband's ex mistress. Vespucci discovers who his wife's affair is with, and despite her being very ill, imprisons her when she refuses to renounce her love for Giuliano. Giuliano confronts Vespucci regarding his wife's absence, and is with her as she dies from her illness. He is disconsolate. Luca's son Bastiano is installed on the council, and Lorenzo wins the vote. Support for the alliance has consequences when in Milan, Sforza is brutally murdered.
15	7	"Betrayal"	"Tradimento"	Jan Michelini	John Fay	13 November 2018	4.29
The new 9-year-old Duke of Milan and the regent, his mother, arrive to reaffirm Milan's alliance. Giuliano questions existence after his lover's death. Salviati and the Pazzi determine that they must rid the world of the Medici, and mercenaries are hired to do the deed. Their plans are overheard in Rome and as a result, Lorenzo's uncle Carlo de' Medici is locked-up. Pope Sixtus IV invites Lorenzo to Rome for peace talks however fearing for his safety he instead sends Clarice. Carlo is forced to pretend all is well when Clarice insists on meeting him. The Pazzi realise both Medici brothers must be murdered at once, and their plans are forced to continually change due to them not being together. Whilst stressing he could not countenance murder, the Pope agrees to sanction the removal of the Medici in Florence, and sends his 17-year-old nephew Cardinal Riario as an envoy with a retinue of 600 from the Papal army.
16	8	"Mass"	"Consacrazione"	Jan Michelini	John Fay	13 November 2018	4.21
The Pazzi conspiracy plays out. Having failed to bring to fruition any of their other plans, at High Mass in the Duomo on Sunday 26 April 1478 before a crowd of 10,000, Giuliano is stabbed 19 times by various mercenaries and Francesco Pazzi. He bleeds to death whilst his brother Lorenzo is seriously wounded as panic grips the congregation whilst mercenaries continue their attacks. Lorenzo, Clarice and his mother are kept safe, terrified, in the sacristy. Meanwhile, Salviati, holding the Gonfalionere hostage in the Palazzo della Signoria, talks to the crowds below indicating that the Pope has sanctioned the removal of the Medici. In the piazza, Pazzi and his nephew tell the crowd that the tyranny of the Medici is over, however they are locked out of the Signoria. With the coast clear, Lorenzo leaves the safety of the sacristy and mourns Giuliano. He walks the piazza and the crowd turns on the Pazzi, with many in the crowd highlighting the benefits to their trade of the Medici being in power. The coup fails, and the senior Pazzi attempts to ride out of town to the safety of the Papal Army massing outside, but the gates are closed and he must seek sanctuary. His nephew is hunted down. Lorenzo, now fully in control of the city, orders the destruction of everything to do with the Pazzi. He wants the family, its possessions, its symbols, and its history expunged from the city. An orgy of violence and looting takes place, leading to despair by Botticelli. Meanwhile, Bianca seeks assurances from her husband, a Pazzi, regarding his role and any knowledge of the conspiracy. Lorenzo's childhood memories of his friendship with Francesco, and words from his dying grandmother years ago, cloud his views of what to do with the conspirators. Salviati and Francesco are hanged from the walls of the Palazzo. Jacopo Pazzi is found by Lorenzo and is also hanged. Clarice appeals for Lorenzo to denounce and end the violence. Botticelli calls for Lorenzo to recognise that it is his kindness and not vengeance that had led the city to support him over the Pazzi. Lorenzo exiles Bianca, her husband and their baby. In Rome, the Pope is outraged by developments.

=== Season 3 (2019) ===
No. overall	No. in season	Title	Italian Title	Directed by	Written by	Original release date	Italy viewers (millions)
17	1	"Survival"	"Sopravvivenza"	Christian Duguay	James Dormer	2 December 2019	4.84
A few years after the murder of Giuliano de' Medici, Lorenzo is shown more tactful and ruthless in dealing with the political challenges spearheaded by Pope Sixtus IV and his ambitious nephew, Girolamo Riario. Riario wants to take the city of Florence to destroy the Medici family. Sixtus asks Lorenzo to visit him in Rome and ask for forgiveness for hanging Bishop Salviati. The Medici family receives an orphaned young boy named Giulio who appears to have been fathered by the late Giuliano. The boy is embraced by Lucrezia and Clarice, but Lorenzo first denies him as his nephew, before eventually witnessing Giuliano's ring in Giulio's hands, and accepting the boy. Giulio finds it hard to adjust to his new family. Lorenzo releases Sixtus' nephew, Cardinal Raffaele, in exchange for his Uncle Carlo from Rome. Carlo is attacked, and barely escapes as he makes his return to Florence. Upon witnessing the deprivation of the Florentine public under excommunication, Clarice warns Lorenzo. After meeting a new priest in Florence, Girolamo Savonarola, and consulting with his new counselor Bruno Bernardi, Lorenzo convinces the bishops of Florence to challenge Sixtus by lifting the ban thus further enraging the pope and Riario, who respond by attacking Florence with the help of Kingdom of Naples.
18	2	"The Ten"	"I Dieci"	Christian Duguay	James Dormer	2 December 2019	4.00
With the threat of an attack by Naples Lorenzo vows to never let Florence fall yet faces internal opposition. He forms the Council of Ten to take control the unrest in the city. Clarice and her children are sent to the villa in Pistoia where Maddalena de' Medici (1473–1528) is born. Friar Girolamo Savonarola clashes with leadership as wives exert their influence. Lorenzo leaves for Naples to meet with Ferdinand I of Naples.
19	3	"Trust"	"Fiducia"	Christian Duguay	Story by : Chris Hurford; Teleplay by : Guy Burt	3 December 2019	4.09
Lorenzo arrives in Naples and makes an appeal to Ferdinand to unite Naples and Florence. Lorenzo befriends Ferdinand by telling him of an Ottoman attack on Naples. He returns to Florence to celebrate his new alliance.
20	4	"Innocents"	"Innocenti"	Christian Duguay	Francesco Arlanch	3 December 2019	3.60
Seven years later, on the eve of a peace conference, Girolamo Riario's men seize Ferrara, 100 miles from Florence and take their salt. Based on the actions by Riario, Pope Sixtus condemns Riario and accepts Lorenzo's invitation to a peace conference in Bagnolo. His mother Lucrezia confides in Clarice about her illness. Lorenzo's son Giovanni is sent to the Curia, in Rome to become a priest.
21	5	"The Holy See"	"La Santa Sede"	Christian Duguay	Guy Burt	9 December 2019	4.10
In Rome, racked by chaos, Lorenzo and Clarice scramble to safeguard peace by helping to select the next pope. Lorenzo's son Giovanni and his cousin are in Rome to prepare for an ecclesiastical career. Lorenzo picks Cardinal Giovanni Battista Cybo for the next pope. Riario's wife befriends Clarice and she gives him evidence of corruption with certain popes. When Cybo wins, Riario and his men try to escape but are killed by Lorenzo and his guards. Friar Girolamo Savonarola preaches to a growing flock back in Florence.
22	6	"A Man of No Importance"	"Un uomo senza importanza"	Christian Duguay	Charlotte Wolfe	9 December 2019	3.56
Lorenzo returns to Florence. Niccolò Ardinghelli turns up the pressure on the Medicis. Lorenzo brings together painters Sandro Botticelli and Leonardo da Vinci. Counselor Bruno revisits an old foe, his family. Tommaso Peruzzi is killed by Bernardi to protect Lorenzo.
23	7	"Lost Souls"	"Anime perdute"	Christian Duguay	Debbie Oates and Ian Kershaw	11 December 2019	3.53
An uneasy peace settles on the Medici household and an ailing Lorenzo. Yet Florence is rife with rumors stirred by friar Girolamo Savonarola. Lorenzo's enemies attack Michelangelo's studio and Lorenzo's residence. After the death of Tommaso Peruzzi, Savonarola seeks to find the killer. Piero Medici (Lorenzo's 1st son) is groomed to succeed Lorenzo upon his death. Giovanni Medici (Lorenzo's second son) is to become a cardinal. Lorenzo's wife, Clarice Orsini dies.
24	8	"The Fate of the City"	"Il destino della città"	Christian Duguay	James Dormer	11 December 2019	3.31
There is a funeral for Lorenzo's wife, Clarice. Friar Savonarola still controls the Florence people. Lorenzo decides to assassinate Savonarola but in the end, prevents the assassination attempt. The council of Ten is dissolved and the people rule Florence. Bruno Bernardi is hanged for his misdeeds. Lorenzo, on his deathbed, asks for God's forgiveness from friar Savonarola. Supporters of Savonarola collected and burned thousands of objects in a so called bonfire of the vanities.

== Cast ==
=== Season 1: Masters of Florence ===
- Richard Madden as Cosimo de' Medici: Head of the Medici family after his father's death
- Stuart Martin as Lorenzo de' Medici: Cosimo's younger brother
- Annabel Scholey as Contessina de' Bardi: Cosimo's wife. Scholey also appears in season 2 as an older Contessina in flashback scenes.
- Guido Caprino as Marco Bello: Cosimo's loyal friend and ally, also appears in season 2 in flashback scenes.
- Alessandro Sperduti as Piero de' Medici: Cosimo's son
- Ken Bones as Ugo Bencini: Administrator of the Medici Bank
- Lex Shrapnel as Rinaldo degli Albizzi: Cosimo's enemy
- Daniel Caltagirone as Andrea Pazzi: A powerful member of the Signoria
- Valentina Bellè (dub. : Aisling Franciosi) as Lucrezia Tornabuoni: Piero's wife
- Alessandro Preziosi (dub. : Jeremy Nicholas) as Filippo Brunelleschi
- Eugenio Franceschini (dub. : Alex Wells-King) as Ormanno Albizzi: Rinaldo and Alessandra's son
- Sarah Felberbaum as Maddalena: Cosimo's lover in Venice and Florence
- Miriam Leone as Bianca: Cosimo's lover in Rome
- Michael Schermi (dub. : Callum Cameron) as Ricciardo: A common man of Florence, loyal to Cosimo
- Tatjana Inez Nardone as Emilia: Contessina's maid
- Valentina Cervi as Alessandra Albizzi: Rinaldo's wife
- Brian Cox as Bernardo Guadagni: Officer of the Signoria
- Dustin Hoffman as Giovanni di Bicci de' Medici: Cosimo and Lorenzo's father
- David Bradley as Count Bardi: Contessina's father
- David Bamber as Pope Eugenius IV
- Anthony Howell as Francesco Sforza

=== Seasons 2–3: The Magnificent ===
- Daniel Sharman as Lorenzo the Magnificent
  - Sam Taylor Buck as young Lorenzo (recurring season 2)
- Bradley James as Giuliano de' Medici (season 2; recurring season 3): Lorenzo's younger brother
- Sarah Parish as Lucrezia Tornabuoni: Lorenzo's mother
- Synnøve Karlsen as Clarice Orsini or Clarice de' Medici: Lorenzo's wife
- Alessandra Mastronardi as Lucrezia Donati: Lorenzo's lover (season 2), ex lover (season 3)
- Julian Sands as Piero de' Medici (recurring season 2): Lorenzo's father
- Matteo Martari (dub. : Jack Hickey) as Francesco de' Pazzi (season 2): Jacopo's nephew
  - Niccolo Alaimo as young Francesco (recurring season 2)
- Aurora Ruffino (dub. : Peta Cornish) as Bianca de' Medici (season 2; recurring season 3): Lorenzo's sister
- Matilda Lutz as Simonetta Vespucci (season 2): Giuliano's lover
- Filippo Nigro as Luca Soderini (season 2): Lorenzo's ally
- Annabel Scholey as Contessina de' Bardi (season 2)
- Sean Bean as Jacopo de' Pazzi (season 2)
- Jacob Fortune-Lloyd as Francesco Salviati (season 2): Archbishop of Piza, ally to the Pazzi family and Pope Sixtus IV
- Raoul Bova (season 2) and John Lynch (recurring season 3) as Pope Sixtus IV
- Louis Partridge as Piero de' Medici (season 3): Lorenzo and Clarice's eldest son
  - Hughie Hamer as young Piero (season 3)
- Andrei Claude as Federico da Montefeltro (season 2)
- William Franklyn-Miller as Giovanni de' Medici (season 3): Lorenzo and Clarice's second son
  - Nico Delpiano as young Giovanni (season 3)
- Jacob Dudman as Giulio de' Medici (season 3): Giuliano and Fioretta's illegitimate son, Lorenzo and Clarice's adoptive son
  - Zukki DeAbaitua as young Giulio (recurring season 3)
- Grace May O'Leary as Maddalena de' Medici (season 3): Lorenzo and Clarice's only daughter
- Francesco Montanari (dub. : Peter Gaynor) as Girolamo Savonarola (season 3)
- Johnny Harris as Bruno Bernardi (season 3)
- Sebastian de Souza as Sandro Botticelli (season 3, recurring season 2): Lorenzo's friend and painter
- Callum Blake as Carlo de' Medici (season 3, recurring season 2): Lorenzo's uncle who lives in Rome
- Jack Roth as Girolamo Riario (season 3): the nephew of Pope Sixtus IV
  - Marius Bizau as younger Girolamo Riario (recurring season 2)
- Toby Regbo as Tommaso Peruzzi (season 3)
- Rose Williams as Caterina Sforza Riario (season 3): Girolamo Riario's wife
- Chiara Baschetti as Fioretta Gorini (season 3): Giuliano's ex-mistress and Giulio's late mother

== Production ==
Sergio Mimica-Gezzan directed all eight episodes in the first season. The show's world premiere took place in Florence at Palazzo Vecchio on 14 October 2016, ahead of its premiere airing on RAI 1 on 18 October.

Filming for the second season started in Rome on 24 August 2017.

On 28 August 2018 filming for the third season started in Formello, outside Rome.

=== Historical accuracy ===
During an interview at the Roma Fest panel in 2015, Spotnitz stated, "the season will be more thriller than historical saga... we begin the show with a 'what if' because we don't know how Giovanni de' Medici died. One of the questions that haunts Cosimo, is whether his father was murdered".

=== Locations ===
Several noticeable locations are used throughout the series, in addition to sets and sound stages:

- Bracciano Castle: The principal courtyards and staircases of the Orsini-Odescalchi castle in Bracciano serve as streets in Florence, a palace in Rome, and the ancestral home of Contessina de' Bardi. The central courtyard in the Castle features a particularly recognisable staircase with the sculpture of a bear; this staircase becomes the principal entrance of the Medici home in Florence with the addition of the Medici Coat of Arms.
- The Villa Farnese in Caprarola and its gardens: The frescoed and ring-vaulted internal terrace-courtyard of Villa Caprarola doubles as a Medici villa in the series, while an un-frescoed terrace is used as a Vatican property in Rome. The Caprarola secret gardens with their unique fountains are used to represent the Vatican Gardens.

The creators took significant liberties with sets, often showing interior decorations, works of art, and exterior landscapes that were created many years after the events described in the series which occur in the mid-1430s. For example, the Medici Palazzo was built in 1440s–1480s and the Benozzo Gozzoli frescoes of Magi Chapel shown in the Cosimo study were executed in 1459–61. The Lorenzo rooms are decorated with the Giulio Romano fresco "Mars and Venus" which was painted in the 1520s in Palazzo Te in Mantova. During the episode exile in Venice, the church of Santa Maria della Salute built in the 1630s is repeatedly shown as part of the Venice city landscape. Villa Medici contains "Fortitude and Temperance with Six Antique Heroes" by Perugino, painted in 1497.

- Castle of Santa Severa is Cardinal Baldassarre Cossa's Palace.
- The medieval oldtown of Viterbo and its Palazzo dei Papi are the set for late medieval Rome.
- Hadrian's Villa in Tivoli is another set for Rome; Cosimo meets Donatello along the Canopus.
- Borgo di Rota, a frazione of Tolfa, is the set for Francesco Sforza's army camp and the village where Lorenzo meets mercenary Ferzetti (played by Alessandro Cremona).
- Pienza: used as the Palazzo Medici, the streets of Florence, and the background for Cosimo's wedding.
- Montepulciano: Several scenes are filmed outside the Duomo using the unfinished façade of the cathedral as a backdrop. These scenes often incorrectly show the Duomo of Florence rising in the background to the north. The Communal Palace, also in Piazza Grande, is part of several scenes, as is the Church of San Biagio.

=== Broadcast ===
Medici: Masters of Florence was originated in 4k video and broadcast in this format on the free Italian satellite service Tivu whilst on the Italian Digital Terrestrial service DVB-T2 it was broadcast in Full-HD 1920×1080.

Two audio tracks were broadcast: Rai TV gave satellite and terrestrial viewers the option to watch the series in Italian or English.

== International transmission ==
Netflix has carried the show in the US, Canada, the UK, Ireland and India since December 2016.

The series is broadcast in 190 countries worldwide, including on SBS in Australia, on Fox Premium in Latin America, SFR's premium SVOD service Zive in France, Sky 1 in Germany, on RTP1 in Portugal, and on RTS 2 in Serbia. It was also sold in Japan, Israel, and New Zealand.

== Home media ==
Season	DVD releases	
Season	Italy	United Kingdom
Medici: Masters of Florence	22 March 2017	11 December 2017
Medici: The Magnificent	24 January 2019	–
I Medici: Nel nome della famiglia	15 January 2020	–

The second season was also released in Blu-Ray (Region B) on 24 January 2019. Both Italian editions have the original audio track in English and the Italian-dubbed audio track.

=== Other media ===
On 16 October 2018, a novelisation of the events told in the second season titled I Medici – Lorenzo il Magnifico was published in Italy by Michele Gazo.

== Soundtrack ==
The soundtrack for the series was composed by Paolo Buonvino. The opening theme song Renaissance was produced with the collaboration of Skin. A video clip for the song was also published the day before the series premiered in Italy.

The opening theme song for the second season changed. Skin and Buonvino collaborated on a variation of the original opening sequence song titled Revolution Bones. Ian Arber composed additional music for the second season.

On 20 December 2019 the full soundtrack I Medici (Music from the Original TV Series) was released by Sugar Music with a total of 47 tracks composed by Paolo Buonvino.

=== Track listing ===
Disc 1
No.	Title	Length
1.	"Lies"	2:01
2.	"Dulcis amor"	1:24
3.	"The Engagement"	2:10
4.	"The Bank"	5:31
5.	"Vision"	3:31
6.	"The Conclave Procession"	0:48
7.	"Lorenzo The Magnificent"	2:27
8.	"War"	4:15
9.	"Dulcis amor, Pt. 2"	2:33
10.	"Vidi aliam bestiam"	3:22
11.	"Pleni sunt"	3:42
12.	"Return to Florence"	1:24
13.	"The Play"	0:55
14.	"Gloria patris"	1:57
15.	"Conium maculatum"	5:12
16.	"Poison"	3:10
17.	"The Battle"	1:26
18.	"Ascent"	5:04
19.	"Love for Duty"	3:20
20.	"Sanctus Kyrie"	2:05
21.	"Plots"	6:59
22.	"The Contract"	1:45
23.	"Lorenzo's Kyrie"	1:37
24.	"Swords"	1:37
25.	"Prison"	3:18
26.	"Albizzi"	3:28
27.	"Firenze"	2:24
28.	"Contessina"	2:11
29.	"The Castle"	2:28
30.	"Bianca"	1:33
31.	"Cosimo's Thoughts"	2:28
32.	"A Moment of Joy"	0:43
33.	"The Dome and the Plague"	1:49
34.	"Cosimo and Contessina"	2:28
35.	"The Truth"	5:05

Disc 2
No.	Title	Length
1.	"Revolution Bones (Paolo Buonvino & Skin)"	1:18
2.	"Attack on the Carriage"	3:02
3.	"La giostra"	3:50
4.	"Pazzi"	2:39
5.	"Gratia et misericordia"	4:58
6.	"La congiura dei Pazzi"	5:31
7.	"Vision of the Future"	2:48

Disc 3
No.	Title	Length
1.	"Deception"	4:52
2.	"Decadence"	3:15
3.	"Afterthought"	2:22
4.	"Alma mia"	3:25
5.	"Renaissance (Paolo Buonvino & Skin)"	5:25
Total length:		2:19:00

== Reception ==
=== Awards ===
Year	Association	Category	Nominee(s)	Result
2016	Capri TV series Award	TV series	Medici: Masters of Florence	Won
2018	La Chioma di Berenice	Best Makeup in Fiction	Giancarlo Del Brocco (for Medici: Masters of Florence)	Won
2018	La Chioma di Berenice	Best Production Design in Fiction	Francesco Frigeri (for Medici: Masters of Florence)	Won
2018	La Chioma di Berenice	Best Costumes in Fiction	Alessandro Lai (for Medici: Masters of Florence)	Nominated
2018	La Chioma di Berenice	Best Soundtrack	Paolo Buonvino (for Medici: Masters of Florence)	Nominated
2018	La Chioma di Berenice	Best Hairstyling	Francesco Pegoretti (for Medici: Masters of Florence)	Nominated
2019	MUSIC+SOUND Awards	Best Original Composition in Television Programme Titles	Medici: The Magnificent	Nominated
