= Maso degli Albizzi =

Maso degli Albizi
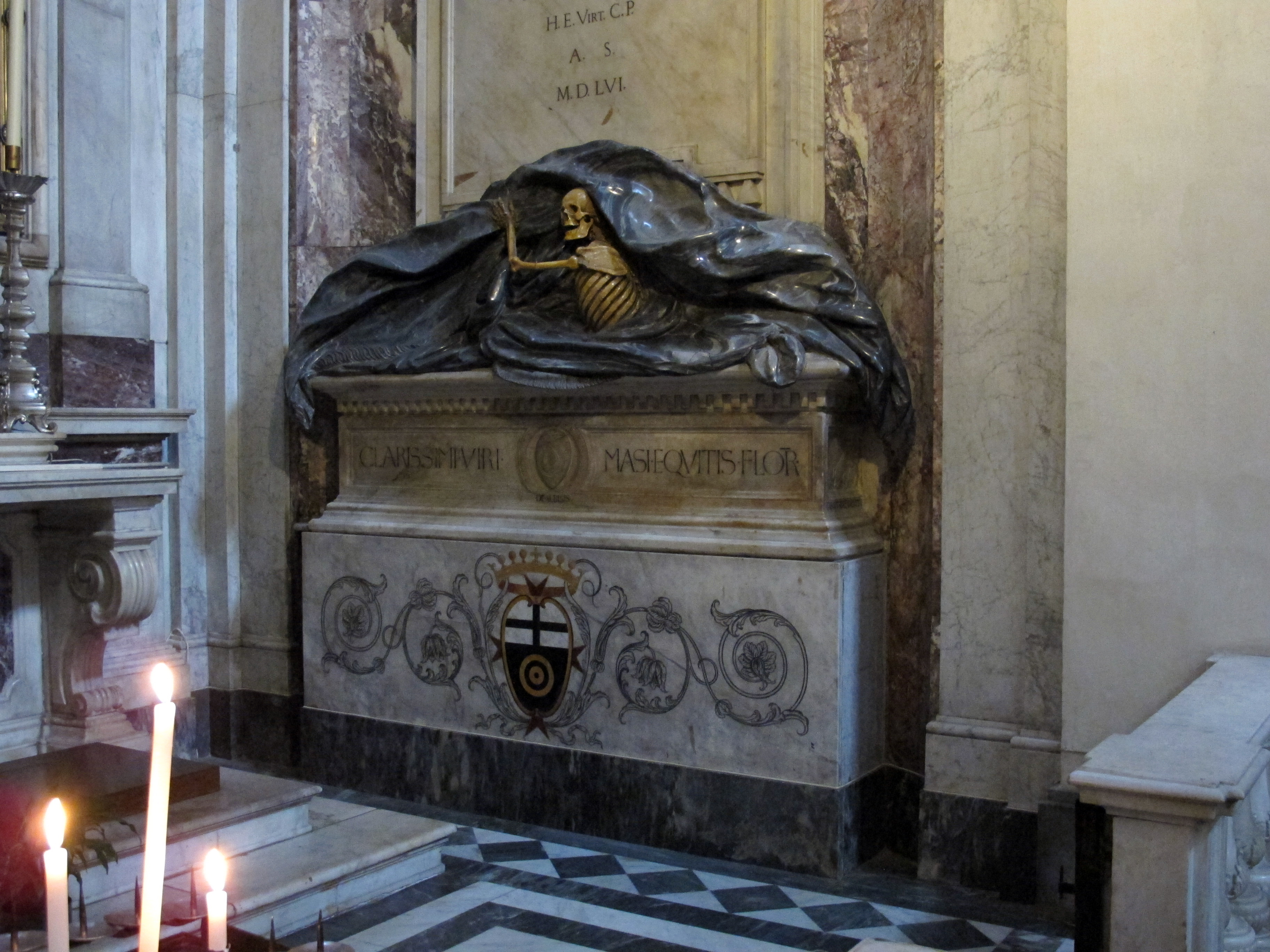
- Mazo Albizzi's coffin

- Coat of arms
- Born: 1347; Republic of Florence
- Died: 1417 (aged 69–70); Ancona
- Noble family: Albizzi
- Spouse: Bartolomea Baldesi
- Issue: 7
- Father: Luca degli Albizzi

Tommaso (Maso) degli Albizzi (1347, Florence — 1417, ibid.) was a Florentine statesman, from 1382 to 1417 the head of the oligarchic party that effectively ruled the Florentine Republic.

== Biography ==
He was the son of Luca, who probably died in 1348, and was one of the most distinguished members of the Albizzi family.

He was initiated at a very young age by his uncle Piero to a political career, siding with the Guelphs and sent on a mission in 1368 to Milan with the Visconti. Driven out of Florence in 1372 circa, he found refuge in Germany, where he fought against the Grand Duchy of Lithuania under the insignia of the Teutonic Order and remained there until 1381. During his absence in Florence, following the uprising called Tumulto dei Ciompi, his house was destroyed and set on fire and he suffered confinement far from the city. He also received news of the beheading of his uncle Piero in 1379 and swore to avenge him.

He returned to his native city in 1381, receiving the confiscated property. He was rehabilitated to politics and was sent by the King of France to inform him of events in Florence and was then sent to the court of the King of Naples Carlo III to negotiate the sale of Arezzo to Florence. In 1389 he went to Milan to negotiate with Duke Gian Galeazzo Visconti, who was intent on subduing Florence. In the following years he was in Genoa, Rimini and Ferrara to forge new alliances against Milan.

After becoming gonfaloniere of Justice in September 1393, he introduced some state reforms, notably helping to raise the age limit for the office of gonfaloniere of Justice to 45. He used his power to expel from the city his personal enemies, in particular almost all the members of the Alberti family and some of the Medici and Ricci families, ancient opponents of the Albizzi family.

During his tenure, Florence prospered in the arts and studies, promoting the growth of the university, which was later taken over by the Medici.

== Honours ==
- Knight of Honour of the Teutonic Order

== Issue ==
Maso married Bartolomea Baldesi by whom he had seven children

- Luca (1382—1458).
- Giovanni
- Ridolfo
- Rinaldo (1370—1442)
- Lisa
- Marietta
- Selvaggia

== Sources ==
=== Italian sources ===
- Litta, Pompeo (1835). Albizzi di Firenze, in Famiglie celebri italiane. Milano.
- L. Simeoni, Le Signorie, Milan 1950; N. Valeri, Le Signorie, Turin 1950. В A. Rado, M. degli A. e il partito oligarchico in Firenze dal 1382 al 1393, Firenze 1926.

=== Russian sources ===
- Макиавелли, Никколо История Флоренции. М., 1999.
- Стратерн, Пол Медичи. Крестные отцы Ренессанса. М., 2010
