= Maria Ormani =

Italian artist

Maria Ormani (born Maria di Ormanno degli Albizzi; 1428 - c. 1470), was an Italian Augustinian Hermit nun-scribe and manuscript illustrator.

She was the granddaughter of Rinaldo degli Albizzi, leader of the aristocratic Guelph party of Republic of Florence; both her father Ormanno and grandfather Rinaldo were exiled when the Medici family returned to Florence in 1434. Maria lived through the turmoil of their condemnation, departure, and confiscation of family properties during this exile. In 1438 she entered the convent of Santa Caterina al Monte, known as San Gaggio, located just outside the walls of Florence. The nuns of San Gaggio formed an elite community with an outstanding library inherited from Cardinal Pietro Corsini. They copied their own breviaries and manuscripts for the Augustinian friars at Santo Spirito, Florence, and for the new Augustinian female convent of Santa Monaca. They were also active in the textiles industry and produced fine linens and gold thread.

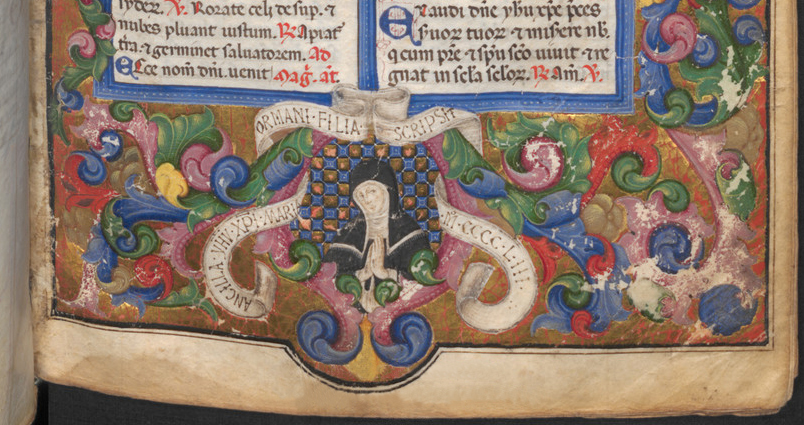
1453 manuscript page with drawing by Ormani

Maria di Ormanno degli Albizzi's most notable work is an apparent self-portrait in a breviary (Ms. Cod. 1923, Oesterreichische Nationalbibliothek, Vienna) that she signed and dated 1453. This is the earliest dated self-portrait by a woman artist in Italian Renaissance art. Her image is framed by a scroll with a Latin inscription describing her as "handmaid of God, daughter of Orman, and the writer of the book." Her inscription gives her father's first name, but drops the family surname. Maria sketched her countenance in silverpoint in the bas-de-page of the Advent frontispiece, but did not paint the border or most initials. Based on the style, the breviary's other initials and borders were finished by north Italian illuminators in the 1470s. Maria's portrait differs from Florentine secular women's portraits of the mid-fifteenth century in its frontal pose and direct "self-possessed" gaze.

== Convent life and scribal work ==
Maria did not accompany her family into exile when her father Ormanno and grandfather Rinaldo, but became a novice at San Gaggio on 20 November 1438, with her dowry paid through the Florentine Comune. This convent offered family connections, an aristocratic community, and an extraordinary library. The library inventory lists 132 religious texts, including the letters of Saints Paul, Jerome, and Bernardo, the homilies of Saint John Chrysostom, the sermons of Innocent III, Clement VI, writings by Peter Damian and Jacobus de Voragine, and doctrinal works by Saints Gregory, Ambrose, Augustine, and Jerome. There were decorated missals, breviaries, and bibles that provided models for copy work, as well as grammar books and dictionaries for the nuns' education. Maria lived in this elite cultural environment with daughters of patrician families including the Medici, Orsini, and Rinuccini until sometime before 1471 when she disappeared from lists of convent residents.

In May 1449 the first record of Maria di Ormanno degli Albizzi's scribal work appears. She was copying Bartolomeo da San Concordio's Summa de casibus conscientiae, known in the vernacular as La Summa Pisanella, for the cleric Antonio di Paolo di Valdambra.

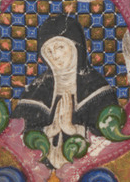
Detail of "Self-portrait of Maria Ormani degli Albizzi"

== Self-portrait context ==
Maria di Ormanno degli Albizzi's portrait-signature is placed in the central bas-de-page, or bottom of the page, for the first Sunday of Advent, which often hosted coats-of-arms, donor portraits, religious narratives, or patron saints and served as an index for the reader. This prominent location and the Latin signature convey Maria di Ormanno degli Albizzi's pride and her social status as a member of the Florentine elite. A close study of the face and scroll shows they were first drawn in silverpoint, and then the nun's habit, scroll, and border were painted.

While it would not be within societal limitations for women to put their work, let alone their self portraits on display for many centuries, Maria di Ormanno degli Albizzi's social status as a member of the Florentine elite, her references of filial piety in paying homage to her family, as well as doing so within a religious context allowed for her artistry to be displayed. At the same time, the pious pose and inscription echoes the words and gesture of the Virgin Annunciate, making her image imitate the Virgin's humility, which would have been appropriate for an Augustinian nun.

== Self-portrait visual analysis ==
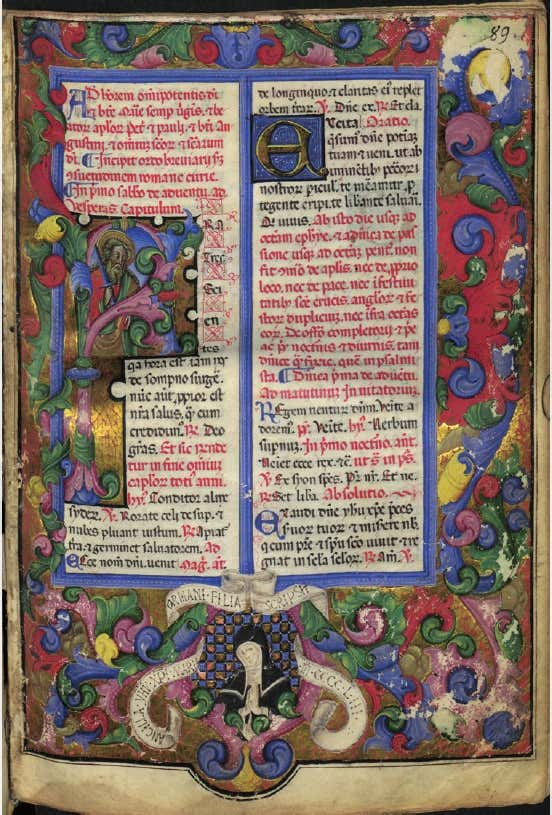
1453 Manuscript Page with Maria Ormani's Portrait Signature

Maria di Ormanno degli Albizzi's portrait-signature depicts herself in front of a checkered background of gold and blue. Her head is bowed with a slight tilt to the left, and. half of her profile more prominent than the other. Her hands are depicted in a position of prayer, with palms together and fingers lightly touching. Maria is adorned in a traditional black and white nun's habit that frames her face. Her image is framed by a cascading scroll with the text, "Ancilla Jhesu Christi Maria, Ormani filia, scripsit, MCCCCLIII." This Latin inscription describes her as, "handmaid of God, daughter of Ormanno, and the writer of the book."

Illustrated swirls emanate from the portraits pink border in colors of green, blue, and red. The manuscript itself is adorned with gold-foil and decorative swirls within a thick border surrounding the main text. The text is transcribed in traditional black and red ink with a thin blue border separating it from the manuscript's illumination.
