= The Age of the Medici =

1973 Italian TV miniseries

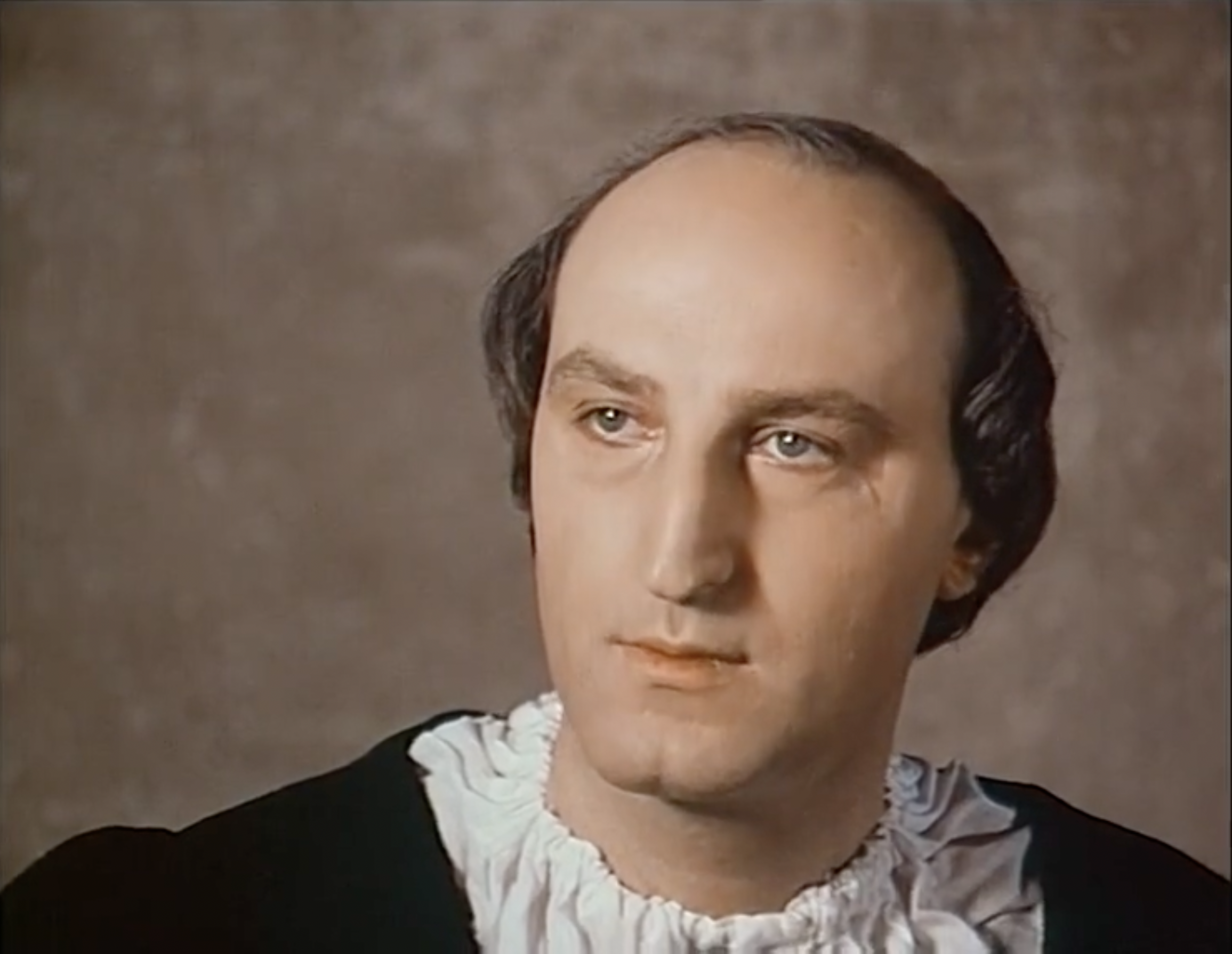
- Marcello Di Falco as Cosimo de' Medici in a scene from the series
- Genre: Docudrama
- Written by: Roberto Rossellini; Marcello Mariani
- Directed by: Roberto Rossellini
- Country of origin: Italy
- Original language: Italian (dubbed)
- No. of seasons: 1
- No. of episodes: 3

Production
- Producer: Renzo Rossellini

Original release
- Network: Programma Nazionale
- Release: December 26, 1972 – January 9, 1973

The Age of the Medici, originally released in Italy as L'età di Cosimo de Medici (The Age of Cosimo de Medici), is a 1973 three-part television series about the Renaissance in Florence, directed by Roberto Rossellini. The series was shot in English, in the hope of securing a North American release, which it failed to achieve, and was later dubbed into Italian and shown on state television. The three television films are: Cosimo de Medici, The Power of Cosimo and Leon Battista Alberti: Humanism. It is Fred Ward's debut role.

== Overview ==
Like several other TV series directed by Rossellini during the 1970s, The Age of the Medici is a form of docudrama, in which historical information is communicated via dramatized conversations between figures from history, and between ordinary people. They are unabashedly "teaching films." As Dave Kehr explains, "The dialogue is bluntly didactic, with characters telling one another things they would already know entirely for the benefit of the audience.... Rossellini isn’t asking his viewers to identify with his characters or become caught up in their personal dramas ... Instead he creates a detached perspective." Each scene plays out in a single long take, with the camera slowly moving and zooming to create different framings of the action, or, as Kehr puts it, "to close in on details or investigate relationships".

When the films debuted in New York's Public Theater in 1973, New York Times movie critic Vincent Canby noted that while not difficult, the austere style of the films, "as well as Rossellini's total lack of concern for what might be called performance, take some getting used to. Yet once you've grasped the method and the rhythm of the films, they are a ravishingly beautiful experience":

The actors make few attempts to act. They recite as they walk about magnificent locations, sounding and looking like ferociously gifted dress-extras. The talk has been rather flatly dubbed into English so that it's not always possible to tell who is speaking.

Forget these problems, though. The film is about what is being said and what you can see around and behind these figures. When you connect with The Age of the Medici, it has the effect of reducing every other film you've seen recently to the status of an ornament.

== Rationale for the films ==
In his book, Un Esprit Libre (A Free Spirit), published in France in 1977, the year he died, Rossellini wrote of his belief that the cinema had reached a dead end. Instead he felt there was a pressing societal need for an education for the whole person in order to free people from the terrible dangers of specialization, which he saw as another form of ignorance. "We are neither ants, nor bees, nor spiders," he wrote, "and yet we have become regimented, stereotyped. . . ." He believed that education today has an effect of "fixing and maintaining" what is already established in a society. He also found ridiculous educational methods that fill brains with facts while suffocating all interest into the why's of life and the world."
