= Guadagno =

Guadagno is a surname. Notable people with the surname include:

- Anton Guadagno (1925–2002), Italian operatic conductor
- Cláudio Guadagno (born 1967), Brazilian football player and manager
- Donald Walter Guadagno (born 1926), birth name of American Don Gordon (actor)
- Johan Guadagno (born 2003), Italian footballer
- Kim Guadagno (born 1959), Lieutenant Governor of New Jersey 2010–18
