= Cosimo de' Medici =

Ruler of Florence from 1434 to 1464

Cosimo di Giovanni de' Medici
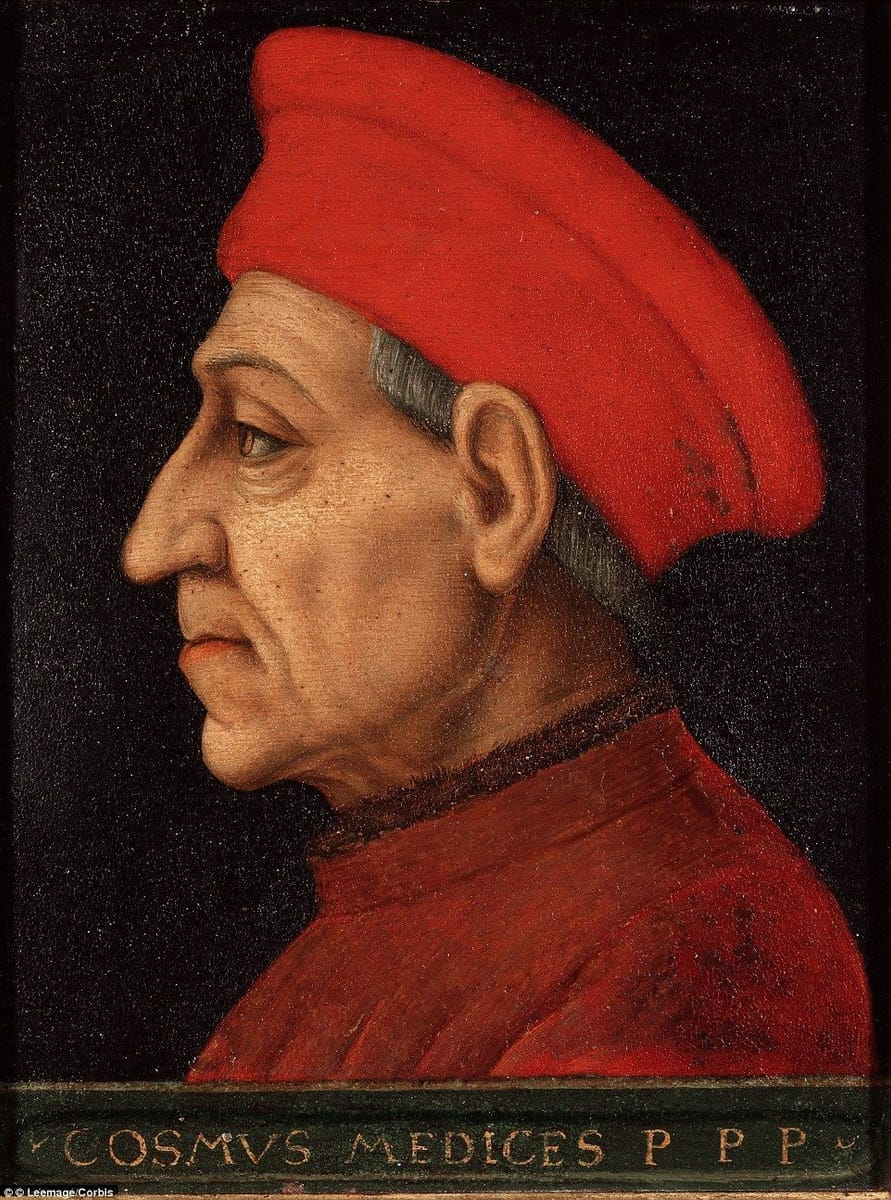
- Posthumous portrait by Bronzino inscription Cosmus Medices P. P. P.

Lord of Florence
- Reign: 6 October 1434 – 1 August 1464
- Successor: Piero the Gouty
- Full name: Cosimo di Giovanni de' Medici
- Born: 27 September 1389; Florence, Republic of Florence
- Died: 1 August 1464 (aged 74); Careggi, Republic of Florence
- Noble family: Medici
- Spouse: Contessina de' Bardi
- Issue: Piero the Gouty; Giovanni de' Medici; Carlo di Cosimo de' Medici (illegitimate)
- Father: Giovanni di Bicci de' Medici
- Mother: Piccarda Bueri

Cosimo di Giovanni de' Medici (27 September 1389 – 1 August 1464) was an Italian banker and politician who became the de facto ruler of Florence during the Italian Renaissance, and was the first to establish the Medici family as its effective leaders for generations.

His power derived from his wealth as a banker and intermarriage with other rich and powerful families. He was a patron of arts, learning, and architecture. He spent over 600,000 gold florins (approx. $500 million inflation adjusted) on art and culture, including Donatello's David, the first freestanding nude male sculpture since antiquity.

Despite his influence, his power was not absolute; he was viewed by fellow Florentine politicians as first among equals rather than an autocrat. Florence's legislative councils resisted his proposals throughout his political career, even sending him into exile from 1433 to 1434.

== Biography ==
=== Early life and family business ===
Cosimo de' Medici was born in Florence, to Giovanni di Bicci de' Medici and Piccarda Bueri, on 27 September 1389. At the time, it was customary to indicate the name of one's father in one's name for the purpose of distinguishing the identities of two like-named individuals; thus, Giovanni was the son of Bicci, and Cosimo's name was properly rendered Cosimo di Giovanni de' Medici. He was born along with a twin brother Damiano, who survived only a short time. The twins were named after Saints Cosmas and Damian, whose feast day was then celebrated on 27 September; Cosimo would later celebrate his own birthday on that day, his "name day", rather than on the actual date of his birth. Cosimo also had a brother Lorenzo, known as "Lorenzo the Elder", who was some six years younger and participated in the family's banking enterprise.

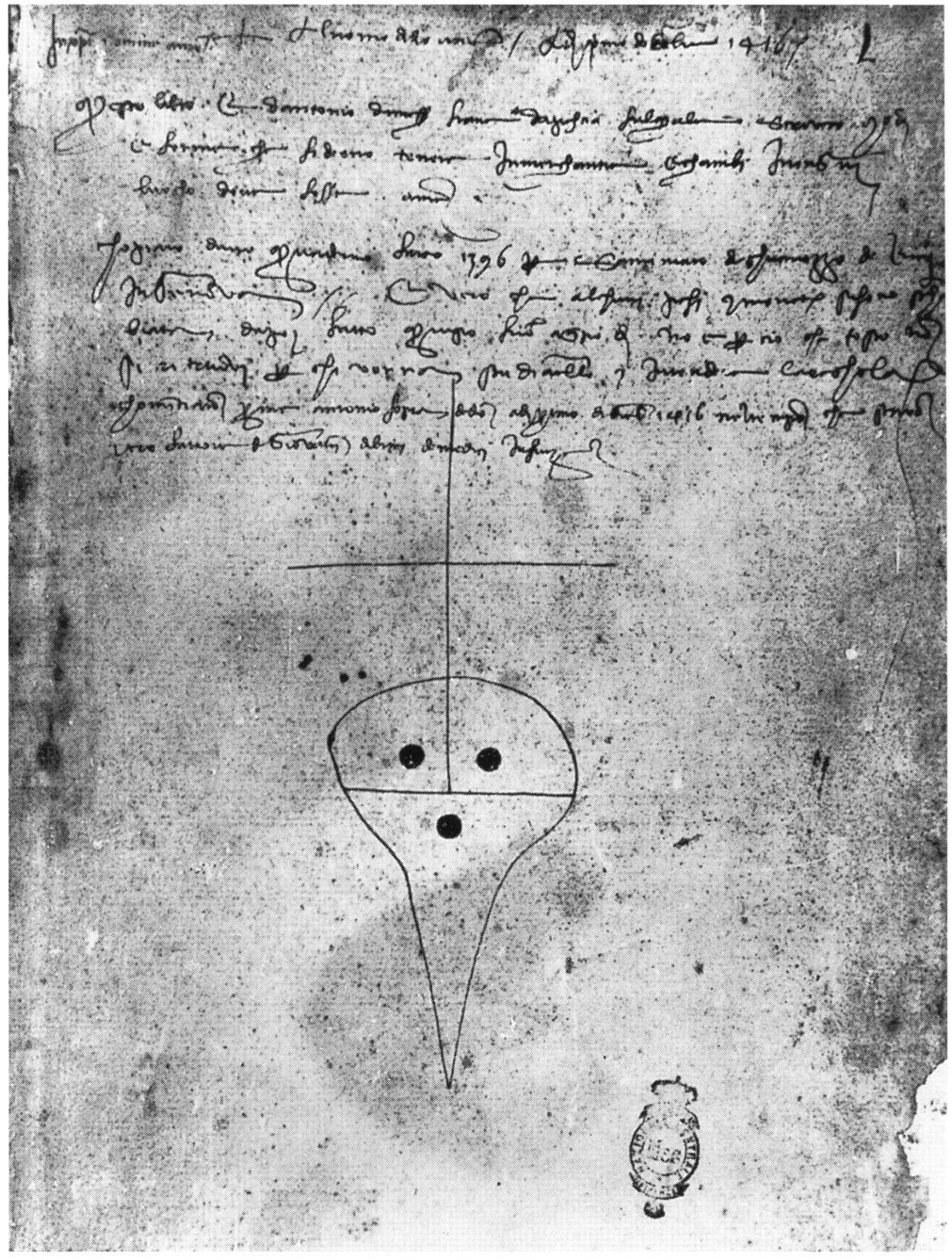
The late medieval mark of the Medici Bank (Banco Medici), used for the authentication of documents. Florence, Biblioteca Nazionale Centrale, Ms. Panciatichi 71, fol. 1r.

Cosimo inherited both his wealth and his expertise in banking from his father Giovanni, who had gone from being a moneylender to join the bank of his relative Vieri di Cambio de' Medici. Giovanni had been running Vieri's branch in Rome independently since the dissolution of the latter's bank into three separate and independent entities until 1397, when he left Rome to return to Florence to found his own bank, the Medici Bank. Over the next two decades, the Medici Bank opened branches in Rome, Geneva, Venice, and temporarily in Naples; the majority of profits was derived from Rome. The branch manager in Rome was a papal depositario generale who managed Church finances in return for a commission. Cosimo would later expand the bank throughout western Europe and opened offices in London, Pisa, Avignon, Bruges, Milan, and Lübeck. The far-flung branches of the Medici rendered it the best bank for the business of the papacy, since it enabled bishoprics in many parts of Europe to pay their fees into the nearest branch, whose manager would then issue a papal license, and the popes could more easily order a variety of wares – such as spices, textiles, and relics – through the bankers' wholesale trade. In fifteen years, Giovanni would make a profit of 290,791 florins.

In 1415, Cosimo allegedly accompanied the Antipope John XXIII at the Council of Constance. In 1410, Giovanni lent John XXIII, then simply known as Baldassare Cossa, the money to buy himself the office of cardinal, which he repaid by making the Medici Bank head of all papal finances once he claimed the papacy. This gave the Medici family tremendous power, allowing them, for instance, to threaten defaulting debtors with excommunication. But misfortune hit the Medici Bank in 1415, when the Council of Constance unseated John XXIII, thus taking away the near monopoly they had held on the finances of the Roman Curia; thereafter, the Medici Bank had to compete with other banks. However, after the Spini Bank of Florence went insolvent in 1420, they again secured priority. John XXIII, facing the enmity of a church council at which he was accused of a large variety of offenses against the Church, was confined by Sigismund, Holy Roman Emperor to Heidelberg Castle until the Medici paid his ransom and granted him asylum. In the same year as John's dethronement (1415), Cosimo was named a "Priore [it] of the Republic [of Florence]". Later he acted frequently as an ambassador for Florence and demonstrated a prudence for which he became renowned.

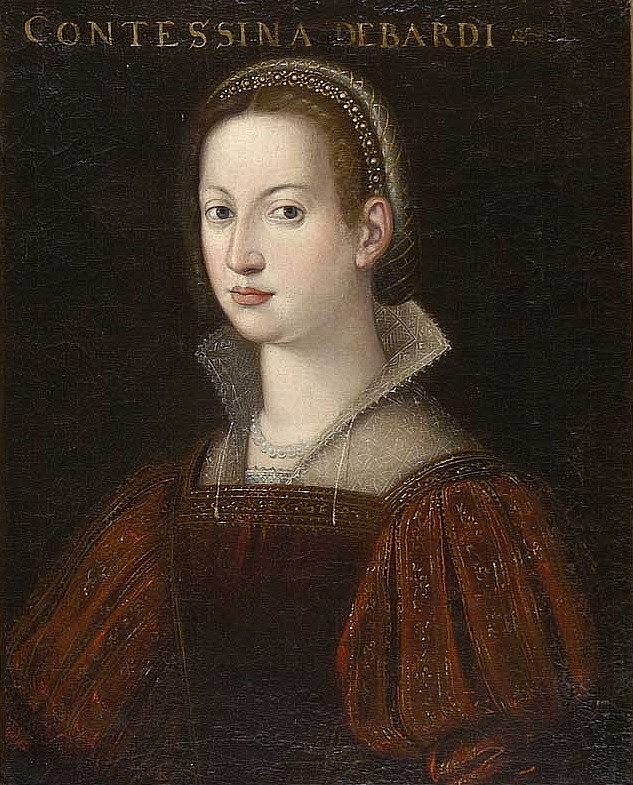
A 16th-century portrait of Contessina de' Bardi, Cosimo's wife, attributed to Cristofano dell'Altissimo.

About 1415, Cosimo married Contessina de' Bardi (the daughter of Alessandro di Sozzo Bardi, count of Vernio, and Camilla Pannocchieschi). The wedding was arranged by his father as an effort to reaffirm relations with the long-standing noble Bardi family, who had operated one of the richest banks in Europe until its spectacular collapse in 1345; they nevertheless remained highly influential in the financial sphere. Only part of the Bardi family were involved in this marriage alliance, for some of the branches considered themselves the opponents of the Medici clan. The couple had two sons: Piero the Gouty (b. 1416) and Giovanni de' Medici (b. 1421). Cosimo also had an illegitimate son, Carlo, by Maddalena a Circassian slave, who would go on to become a prelate.

Giovanni withdrew from the Medici Bank in 1420, leaving its leadership to both of his surviving sons. He left them 179,221 florins upon his death in 1429. Two-thirds of this came from the business in Rome, while only a tenth came from Florence; even Venice offered better returns than Florence. The brothers would earn two-thirds of the profits from the bank, with the other third going to a partner. Besides the bank, the family owned much land in the area surrounding Florence, including Mugello, the place from which the family originally came.

=== Florentine politics ===
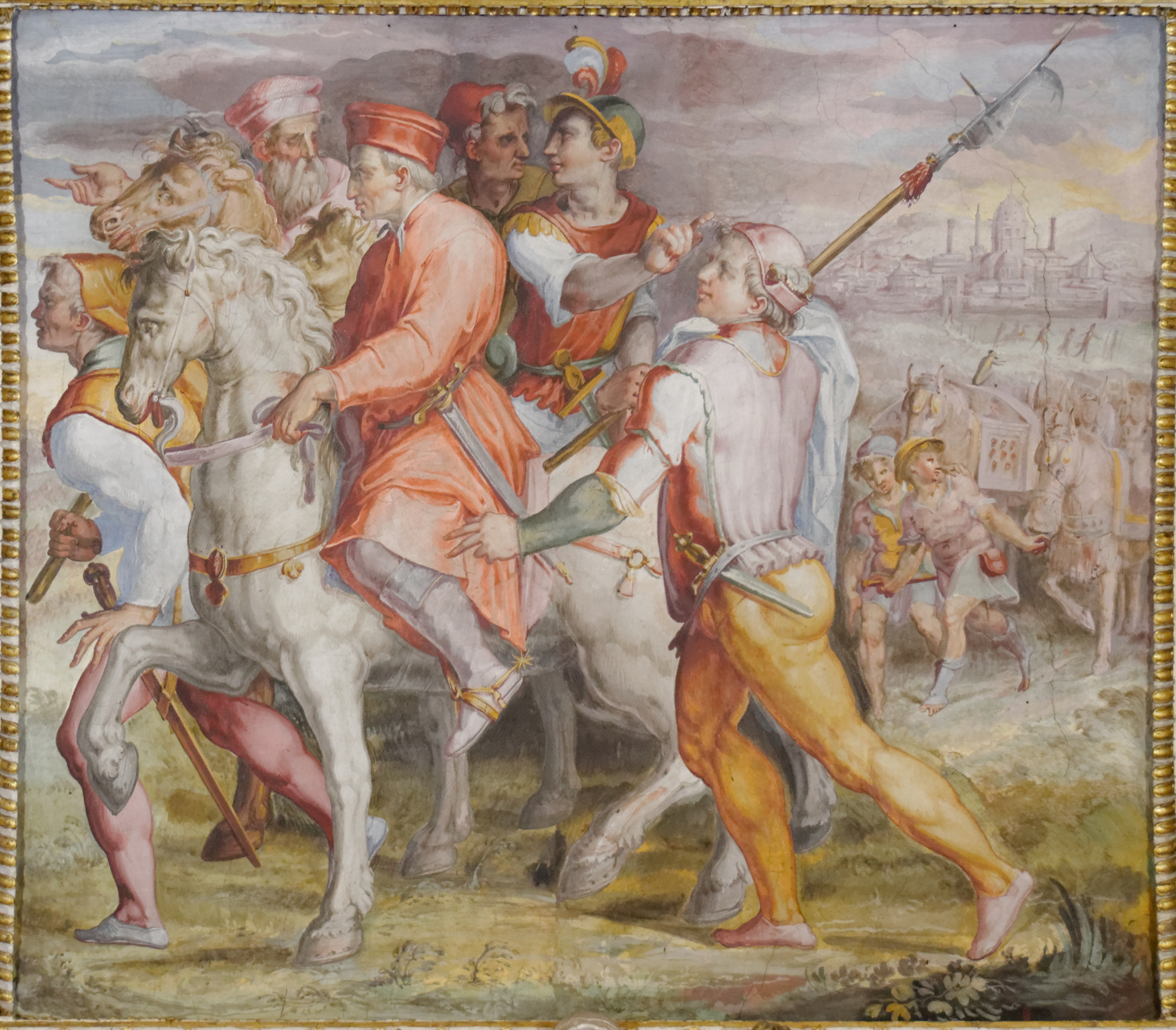
Cosimo goes into exile, Palazzo Vecchio.

Cosimo's power over Florence stemmed from his wealth, which he used to control the votes of office holders in the municipal councils, most importantly the Signoria of Florence. As Florence was proud of its republic, he pretended to have little political ambition and did not often hold public office. Enea Silvio Piccolomini, Bishop of Siena and later Pope Pius II, said of him:

Political questions are settled in [Cosimo's] house. The man he chooses holds office... He is who decides peace and war... He is king in all but name.

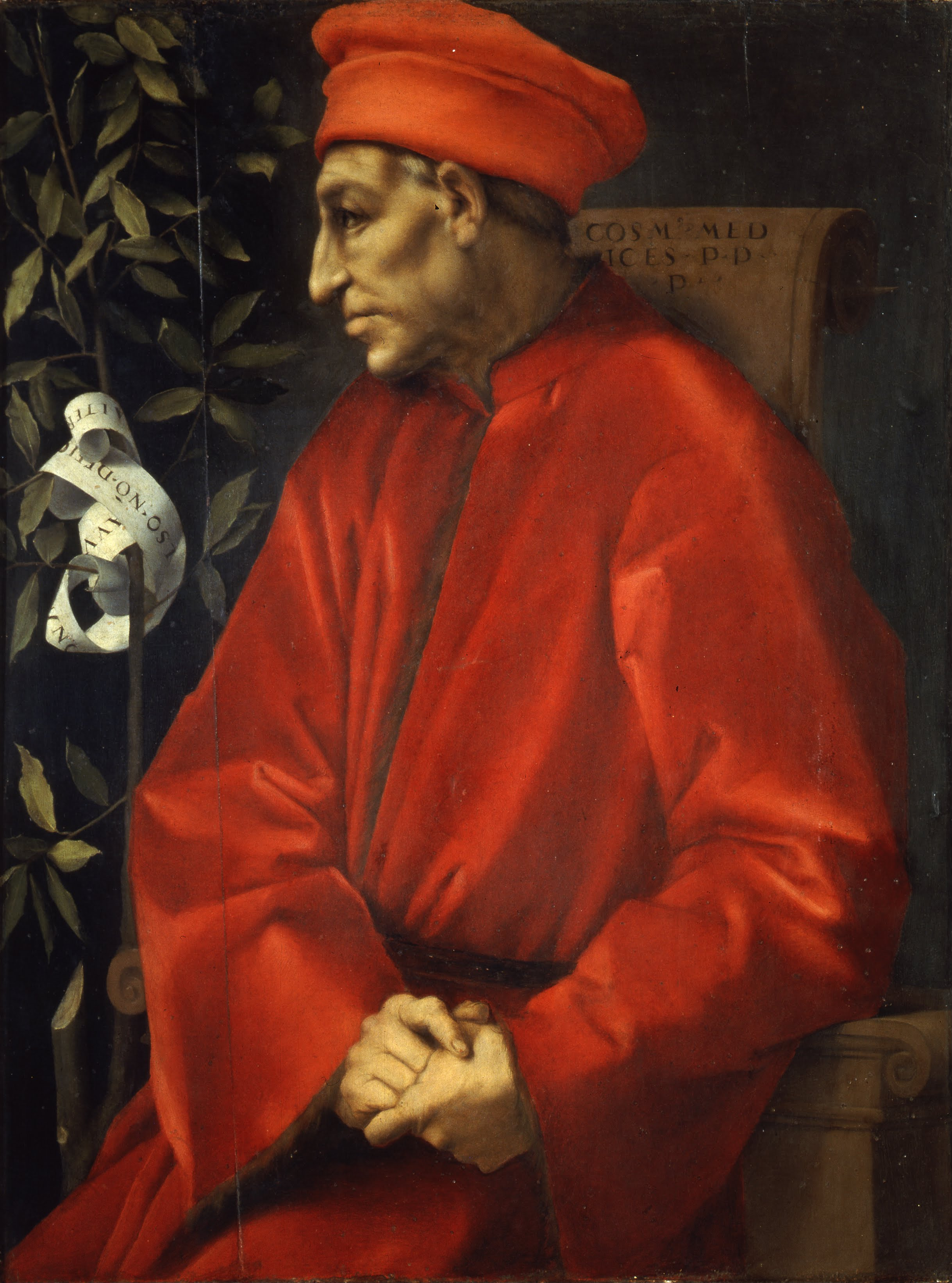
Posthumous portrait by Jacopo Pontormo; the laurel branch (il Broncone) was a symbol used also by his heirs

In 1433, Cosimo's power over Florence began to look like a menace to the anti-Medici party led by figures such as Palla Strozzi and the Albizzi family, headed by Rinaldo degli Albizzi. In September of that year, Cosimo was imprisoned in the Palazzo Vecchio for his part in the failure in 1429-30 to conquer the Republic of Lucca, but he managed to turn the jail term into one of exile. Some prominent Florentines, such as Francesco Filelfo, demanded his execution, a fate that may have been almost certain without the intervention of the monk Ambrogio Traversari on his behalf. Cosimo travelled to Padua and then to Venice, taking his bank along with him and finding friends and sympathizers wherever he went for his willingness to accept exile rather than resume the bloody conflicts that had chronically afflicted the streets of Florence. Venice sent an envoy to Florence on his behalf and requested that they rescind the order of banishment. When they refused, Cosimo settled down in Venice, his brother Lorenzo accompanying him. However, prompted by his influence and his money, others followed him, such as the architect Michelozzo, whom Cosimo commissioned to design a library as a gift to the Venetian people. Within a year, the flight of capital from Florence was so great that the decree of exile had to be lifted. Cosimo returned a year later, in 1434, to influence the government of Florence (especially through the Pitti and Soderini families) for the last 30 years of his life of 74 years.

Cosimo's time in exile instilled in him the need to quash the factionalism that resulted in his exile in the first place. In order to do this, he instigated a series of constitutional changes with the help of favourable priors in the Signoria to secure his power through influence.

Following the death of Filippo Maria Visconti, who had ruled the Duchy of Milan from 1412 until his death in 1447, Cosimo sent Francesco I Sforza to establish himself in Milan to prevent an impending military advance from the Republic of Venice. Francesco Sforza was a condottiere, a mercenary soldier who had stolen land from the papacy and proclaimed himself its lord. He had yearned to establish himself at Milan as well, an ambition that was aided by the fact that the current Visconti head lacked legitimate children save for a daughter, Bianca, whom Sforza ultimately married in November 1441 after a failed attempt at winning her hand from her father. The resultant balance of power with Milan and Florence on the one side and Venice and the Kingdom of Naples on the other created nearly half a century of peace that enabled the development of the Renaissance in Italy. However, despite the benefits to Florence from keeping Venice at bay, the intervention in Milan was unpopular among Cosimo's fellow citizens, primarily because they were called upon to finance the Sforza succession. The Milanese made a brief attempt at a republic before Sforza was finally acclaimed duke by the city in February 1450.

In terms of foreign policy, Cosimo worked to create peace in northern Italy through the creation of a balance of power between Florence, Naples, Venice and Milan during the wars in Lombardy between 1423 and 1454 and the discouragement of outside powers (notably the French and the Holy Roman Empire) from interfering in Italian affairs. In 1439, he was instrumental in convincing Pope Eugene IV to move the Ecumenical Council of Ferrara to Florence. The arrival of many notable Byzantine figures from the Eastern Roman Empire, including Emperor John VIII Palaiologos, for this event further inspired the growing interest in ancient Greek arts and literature.

=== Death ===
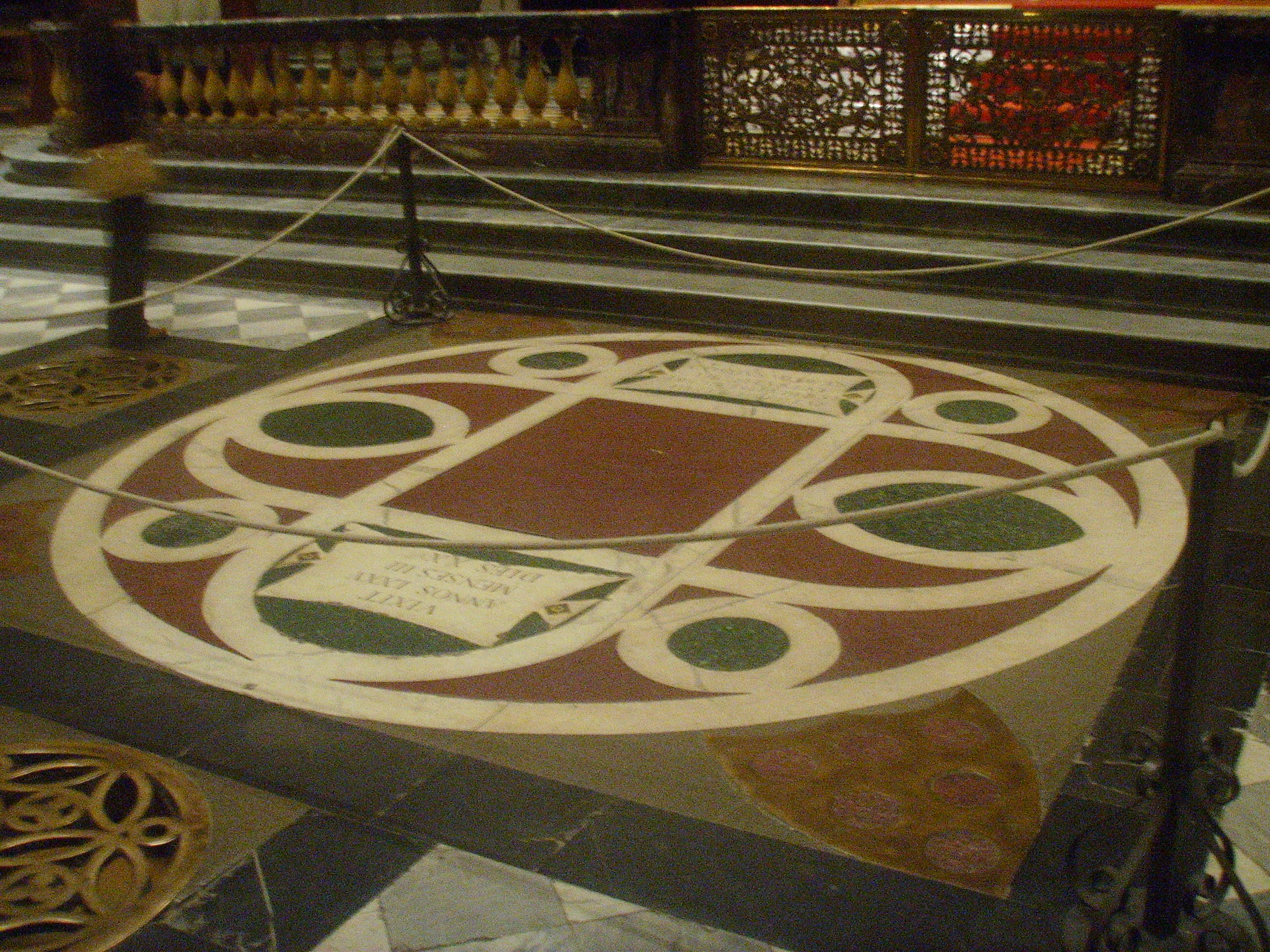
The floor tomb of Cosimo de' Medici in the Basilica of San Lorenzo, Florence

"[Cosimo was] the father of a line of princes, whose name and age are almost synonymous with the restoration of learning; his credit was ennobled into fame; his riches were dedicated to the service of mankind; he corresponded at once with Cairo and London; and a cargo of Indian spices and Greek books were often imported in the same vessel."

— Edward Gibbon (1880). The History of the Decline and Fall of the Roman Empire. Philadelphia: Nottingham Society. pp. 456–457

On his death on 1 August 1464 at Careggi, Cosimo was succeeded by his son Piero, father of Lorenzo the Magnificent. After Cosimo's death, the Signoria awarded him the title Pater Patriae, "Father of the Fatherland", an honour once awarded to Cicero, and had it carved upon his tomb in the Church of San Lorenzo.

== Patronage ==
Cosimo de' Medici used his personal fortune to control the Florentine political system and to sponsor orators, poets and philosophers, as well as a series of artistic accomplishments.

=== Arts ===
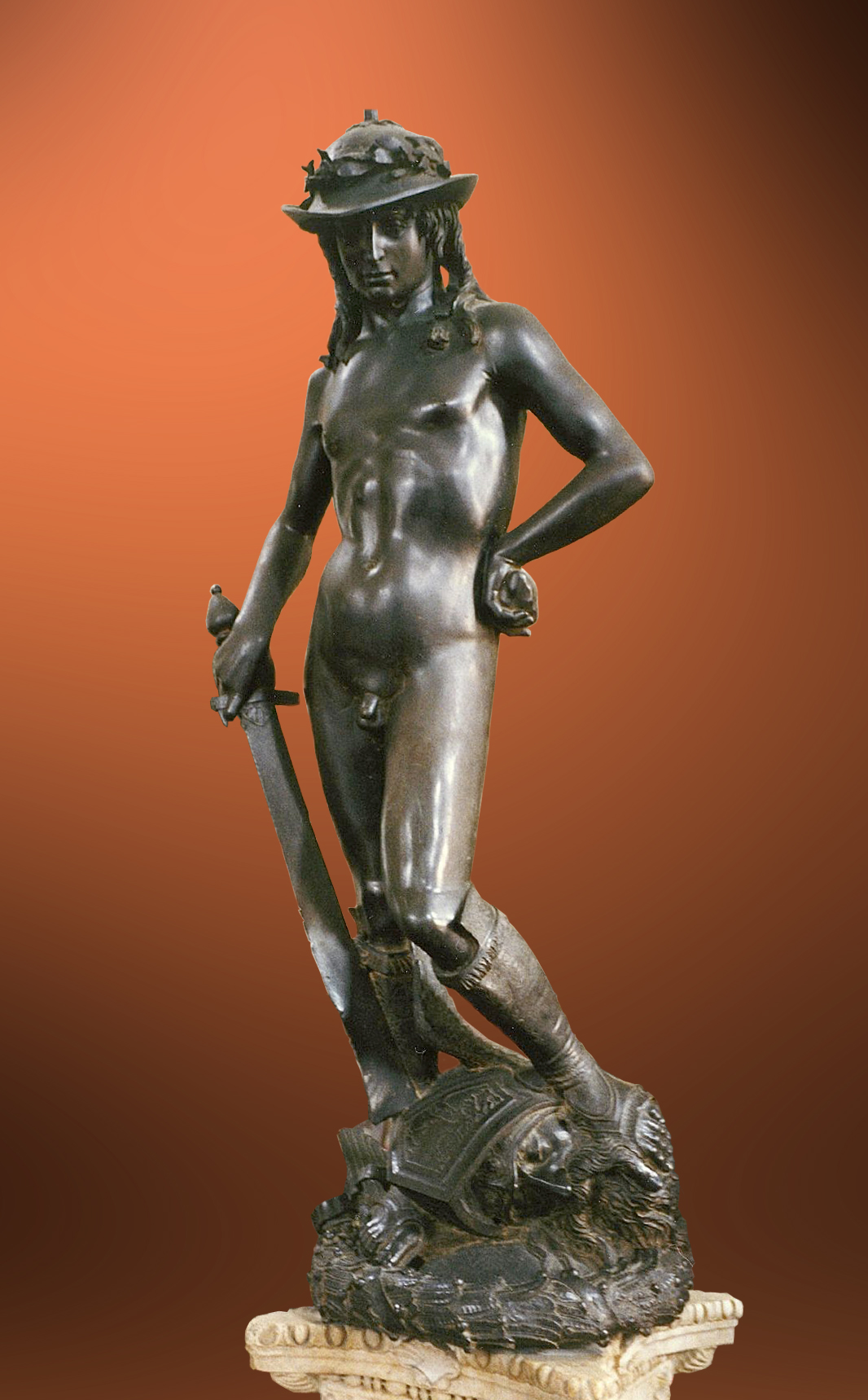
Donatello's David, a Medici commission.

Cosimo was also noted for his patronage of culture and the arts during the Renaissance and spent the family fortune liberally to enrich the civic life of Florence. According to Salviati's Zibaldone, Cosimo stated: "All those things have given me the greatest satisfaction and contentment because they are not only for the honour of God but are likewise for my own remembrance. For fifty years, I have done nothing else but earn money and spend money; and it became clear that spending money gives me greater pleasure than earning it." Additionally, his patronage of the arts both recognized and proclaimed the humanistic responsibility of the civic duty that came with wealth.

Cosimo hired the young Michelozzo Michelozzi to create what is today perhaps the prototypical Florentine palazzo, the austere and magnificent Palazzo Medici. The building still includes, as its only 15th-century interior that is largely intact, the Magi Chapel frescoed by Benozzo Gozzoli, completed in 1461 with portraits of members of the Medici family parading through Tuscany in the guise of the Three Wise Men. He was a patron and confidante of Fra Angelico, Fra Filippo Lippi, and Donatello, whose famed David and Judith Slaying Holofernes were Medici commissions. His patronage enabled the eccentric and bankrupt architect Brunelleschi to complete the dome of Santa Maria del Fiore (the "Duomo") in 1436.

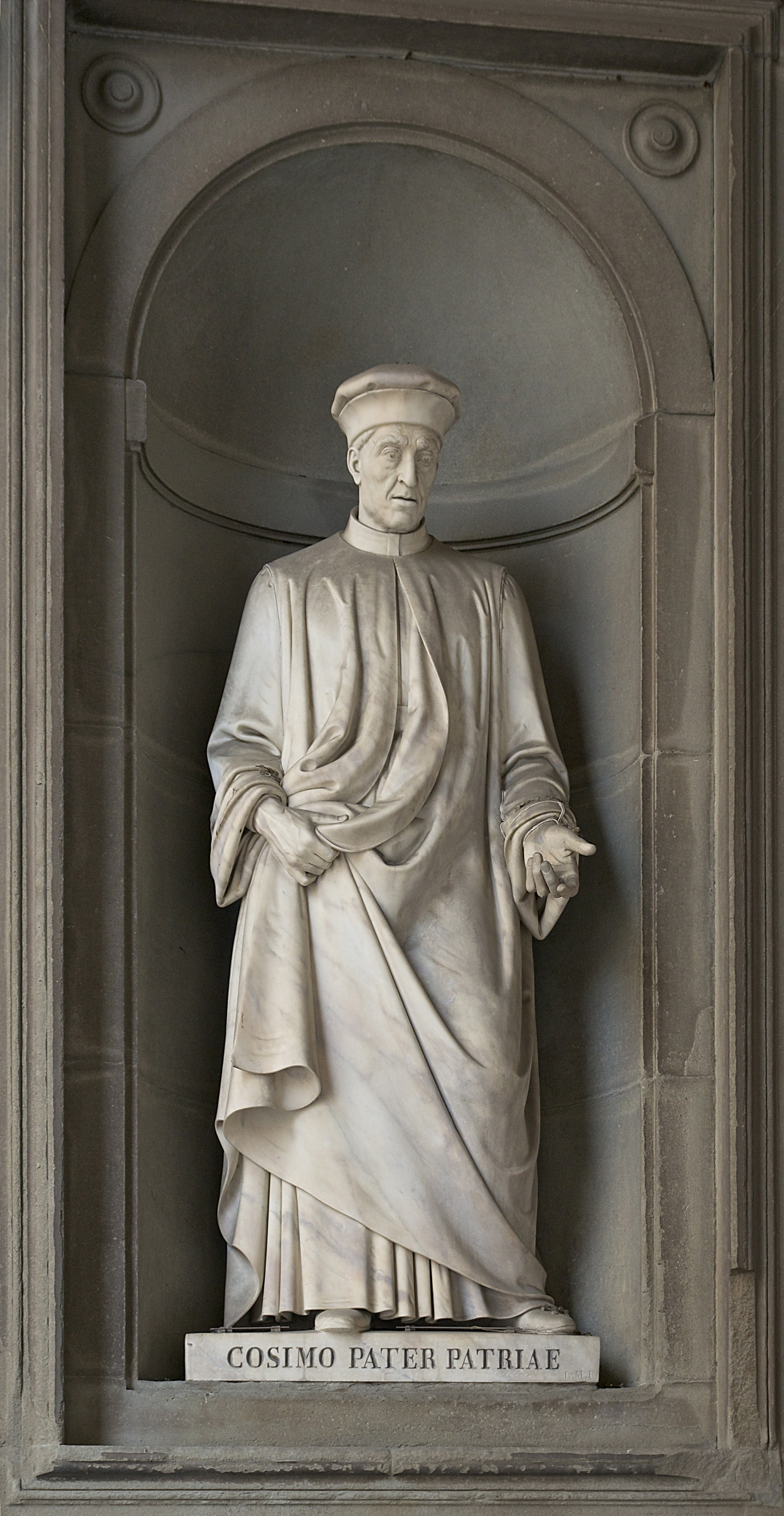
Cosimo Pater patriae, Uffizi Gallery, Florence.

=== Libraries ===
In 1444, Cosimo de' Medici founded the first public library in Florence, at San Marco, which was of central importance to the humanist movement in Florence during the Renaissance. It was designed by Michelozzo, a student of Lorenzo Ghiberti who later collaborated with Donatello and was also a good friend and patron to Cosimo. Cosimo contributed the funds necessary to repair the library and provide it with a book collection, which people were allowed to use at no charge. "That Cosimo de'Medici was able to finance the construction of such a site placed him in a privileged position of leadership in the city. He hand-selected those individuals who were given access to this laboratory of learning, and, through this social dynamic, he actively shaped the politics of the Republic."

Cosimo also commissioned Michelozzo to design a library for his grandson, Lorenzo de' Medici. His first library, however, was designed by Michelozzo while the two were in Venice, where Cosimo had been temporarily exiled. In 1433, in gratitude for the hospitality of that city, he left it as a gift, his only such work outside Florence. His libraries were noted for their Renaissance style of architecture and distinguished artwork.

Cosimo had grown up with only three books, but by the time he was thirty, his collection had grown to 70 volumes. After being introduced to humanism by a group of literati who had asked for his help in preserving books, he grew to love the movement and gladly sponsored the effort to renew Greek and Roman civilization through literature, for which book collecting was a central activity. "Heartened by the romantic wanderlust of a true bibliophile, the austere banker even embarked on several journeys in the hunt for books, while guaranteeing just about any undertaking that involved books. He financed trips to nearly every European town as well as to Syria, Egypt, and Greece organized by Poggio Bracciolini, his chief book scout." He engaged 45 copyists under the bookseller Vespasiano da Bisticci to transcribe manuscripts and paid off the debts of Niccolò de' Niccoli after his death in exchange for control over his collection of some 800 manuscripts valued at around 6,000 florins. These manuscripts that Cosimo acquired from Niccoli would later be the cornerstone of the Laurentian Library, a library in Florence founded by Cosimo's grandson, Lorenzo de' Medici.

=== Philosophy ===
In the realm of philosophy, Cosimo, influenced by the lectures of Gemistus Plethon, supported Marsilio Ficino and his attempts at reviving Neo-Platonism. Cosimo commissioned Ficino's Latin translation of the complete works of Plato (the first ever complete translation) and collected a vast library that he shared with intellectuals such as Niccolò de' Niccoli and Leonardo Bruni. He also established a Platonic Academy in Florence in 1445. He provided his grandson Lorenzo de' Medici with an education in the studia humanitatis. Cosimo certainly had an influence on Renaissance intellectual life, but it was Lorenzo who would later be deemed to have been the greatest patron.

== Fictional depictions ==
Roberto Rossellini's three-part television miniseries The Age of the Medici (1973) has Cosimo as its central character (the original Italian title is L'età di Cosimo de' Medici, meaning "The Age of Cosimo de' Medici"). The first part, The Exile of Cosimo, and the second part, The Power of Cosimo, focus on Cosimo's political struggles and on his patronage of the arts and sciences in Florence. Cosimo is portrayed by Italian actor Marcello Di Falco.

Frank Spotnitz's eight-part television series Medici: Masters of Florence (2016) depicts the rise of the powerful banking family after the death of Giovanni (played by Dustin Hoffman), as his son Cosimo (Richard Madden) takes over as head of the family. The sixteen-part sequel, Medici (2019–2020), follows the career of Cosimo's grandson, Lorenzo the Magnificent (Daniel Sharman).

== See also ==
- History of Florence
- Florentine Renaissance art
