= Marcella Di Folco =

Italian LGBT rights activist, actor, and politician (1943–2010)

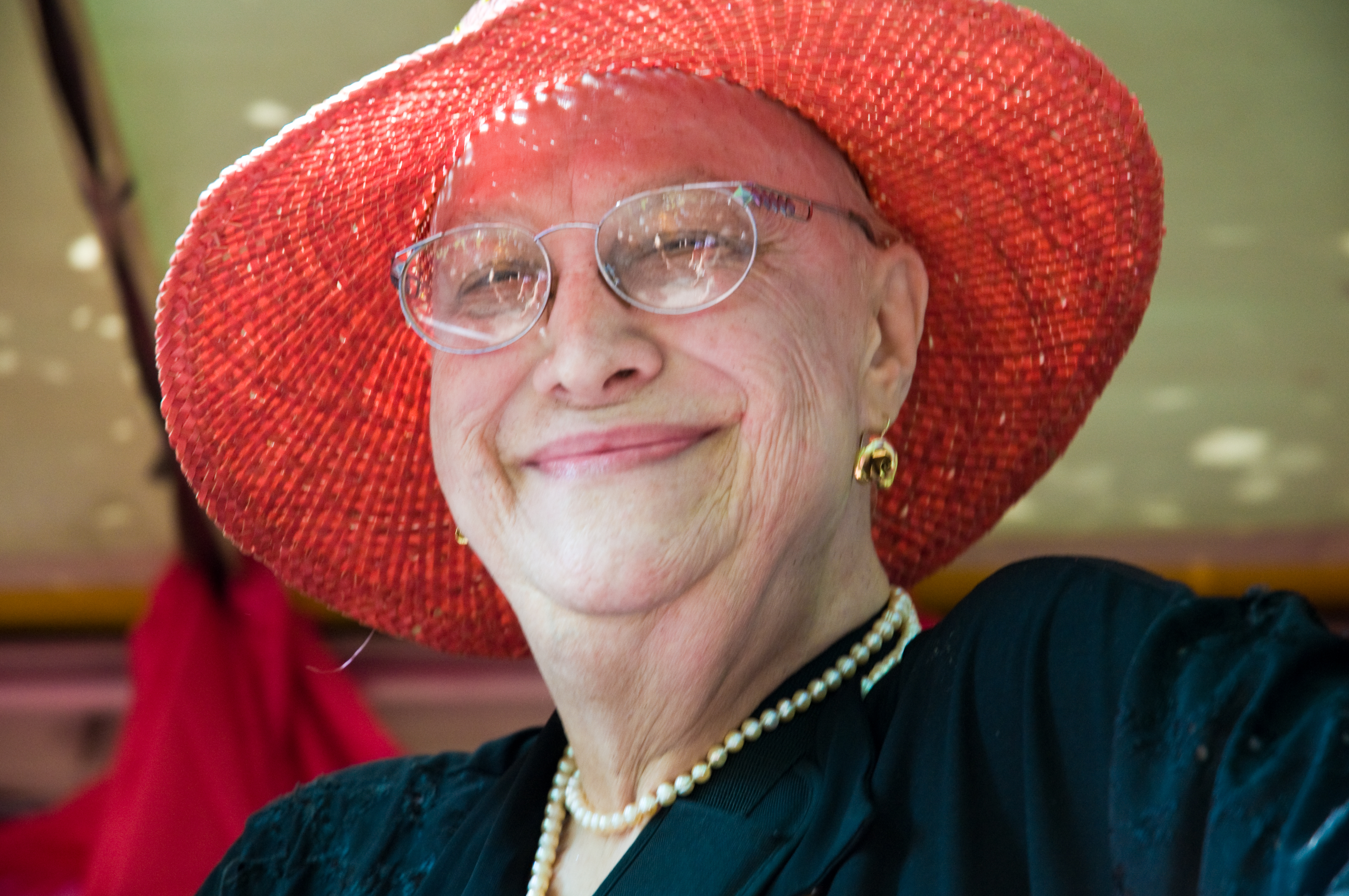
- Di Folco in 2008
- Born: 7 March 1943; Rome, Kingdom of Italy
- Died: 7 September 2010 (aged 67); Bentivoglio, Italy
- Other name: Marcello Di Falco
- Occupations: Activist; actress; politician
- Political party: Federation of the Greens

Marcella Di Folco (7 March 1943 – 7 September 2010) was an Italian LGBT rights activist, actor, and politician. In her film appearances, played in male characters before transition, she is credited as Marcello Di Falco.

== Career ==
In 1988, she became president of the MIT - Movimento Identità Transessuale (Transsexual Identity Movement) and in 1997 vice-president of the Osservatorio Nazionale sull'Identità di Genere (National Observatory on Gender Identity, ONIG).

She was elected municipal councilor of Bologna in 1995, with the Green party. She was the first open trans woman to hold a political public office in the world. In 2014, at the 32nd Torino Film Festival, the film Una nobile rivoluzione (A Noble Revolution) by Simone Cangelosi, which tells her story had its premiere. In October 2019 Italian Journalist Bianca Berlinguer edited Storia di Marcella che fu Marcello (The Story of Marcella that was Marcello before) a confession of Marcella Di Folco's life she recorded before Marcella died. In 2024 her documentary biography has been included in Disobedience Archive, a Marco Scotini project dealing with LGBT issues, invited by Curator Adriano Pedrosa at Foreigners Everywhere art exhibition at 60th Venice Biennale.

== Personal life ==
Di Folco had gender affirming surgery in 1987.

== Filmography ==
- Fellini Satyricon, directed by Federico Fellini (1969)
- In the Name of the Italian People, directed by Dino Risi (1971)
- Sotto a chi tocca!, directed by Gianfranco Parolini (1972)
- I racconti di Canterbury N. 2, directed by Lucio Dandolo (1972)
- Roma, directed by Federico Fellini (1972)
- Anche se volessi lavorare, che faccio?, directed by Flavio Mogherini (1972)
- Decameron nº 2 - Le altre novelle del Boccaccio, directed by Mino Guerrini (1972)
- L'età di Cosimo de' Medici, directed by Roberto Rossellini (1973) (film TV)
- Amarcord, directed by Federico Fellini (1973)
- Shoot First, Die Later, directed by Fernando Di Leo (1974)
- Finché c'è guerra c'è speranza, directed by Alberto Sordi (1974)
- Cartesius, directed by Roberto Rossellini (1974) (film TV)
- Quant'è bella la Bernarda, tutta nera, tutta calda, directed by Lucio Dandolo (1975)
- Di che segno sei?, directed by Sergio Corbucci (1975)
- Mondo candido, directed by Gualtiero Jacopetti e Franco Prosperi (1975)
- Vinella e Don Pezzotta, directed by Mino Guerrini (1976)
- Todo modo, directed by Elio Petri (1976)
- Tutti possono arricchire tranne i poveri, directed by Mauro Severino (1976)
- Un borghese piccolo piccolo, directed by Mario Monicelli (1977)
- Squadra antigangsters, directed by Bruno Corbucci (1979)
- Joséphine ou la comédie des ambitions, directed by Robert Mazoyer (1979) (miniserie TV)
- La città delle donne, directed by Federico Fellini (1980)
- I carabbinieri, directed by Francesco Massaro (1981)
