= Villani =

Villani is an Italian surname that can also be found in France. Notable people with the surname include:

- Anna Villani (born 1966), Italian marathon runner
- Carmen Villani (born 1944), former Italian pop singer
- Cédric Villani, French mathematician and politician
- Carlo "Charlie" Villani (born 1963), Australian former football (soccer) player
- Elyse Villani (born 1989), Australian cricketer
- Filippo Villani, Florentian chronicler
- Giacomo Villani (1605–1690), Italian Roman Catholic prelate, bishop of Caiazzo
- Giovanni Villani, Florentian banker, official, diplomat and chronicler
- Jamian Juliano-Villani (born 1987), American painter
- Matteo Villani (1283–1363), Italian historian
- Matteo Villani (athlete) (born 1982), Italian steeplechase runner
- Olga Villani, known as Olga Villi (1922–1989), Italian model and actress
- Pat Villani (1954–2011), American computer programmer and author
- Ralph A. Villani (1901–1974), American politician, mayor of Newark
- Sofia Villani Scicolone, known as Sophia Loren (1934), Italian film actress and singer

== See also ==
- Vilani (disambiguation)
