= Nuova Cronica =

14th-century historical record of Florence, Italy; written by Giovanni Villani

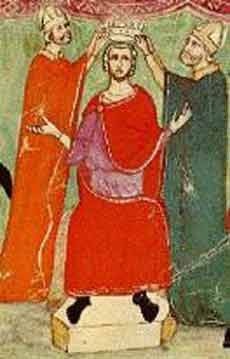
The crowning of Manfred of Sicily in a manuscript of the Cronica; by the 16th century, there were multiple versions of the Cronica in printed form as well as in illuminated manuscript form.

The Nuova Cronica (also: Nova Cronica) or New Chronicles is a 14th-century history of Florence created in a year-by-year linear format and written by the Italian banker and official Giovanni Villani (c. 1276 or 1280–1348). The idea came to him in the year 1300, after attending Rome's first Jubilee (special year of remission of sins, debts and universal pardon). Villani realized that Rome's many historical achievements were well-known and desired to lay out a history of the origins of his own city of Florence. In his Cronica, Villani described in detail the many building projects of the city, statistical information on population, ordinances, commerce and trade, education, and religious facilities. He also described several disasters such as famines, floods, fires, and the pandemic of the Black Death in 1348, which would take his own life. Villani's work on the Nuova Cronica was continued by his brother Matteo (from April 1348 until July 1363) and his nephew Filippo (until 1364) after his death. It has been described as the first introduction of statistics as a positive element in history.

The oldest manuscript is Vatican Library BAV Chigiano L VIII 296, dating to the time of composition.

== Organization ==
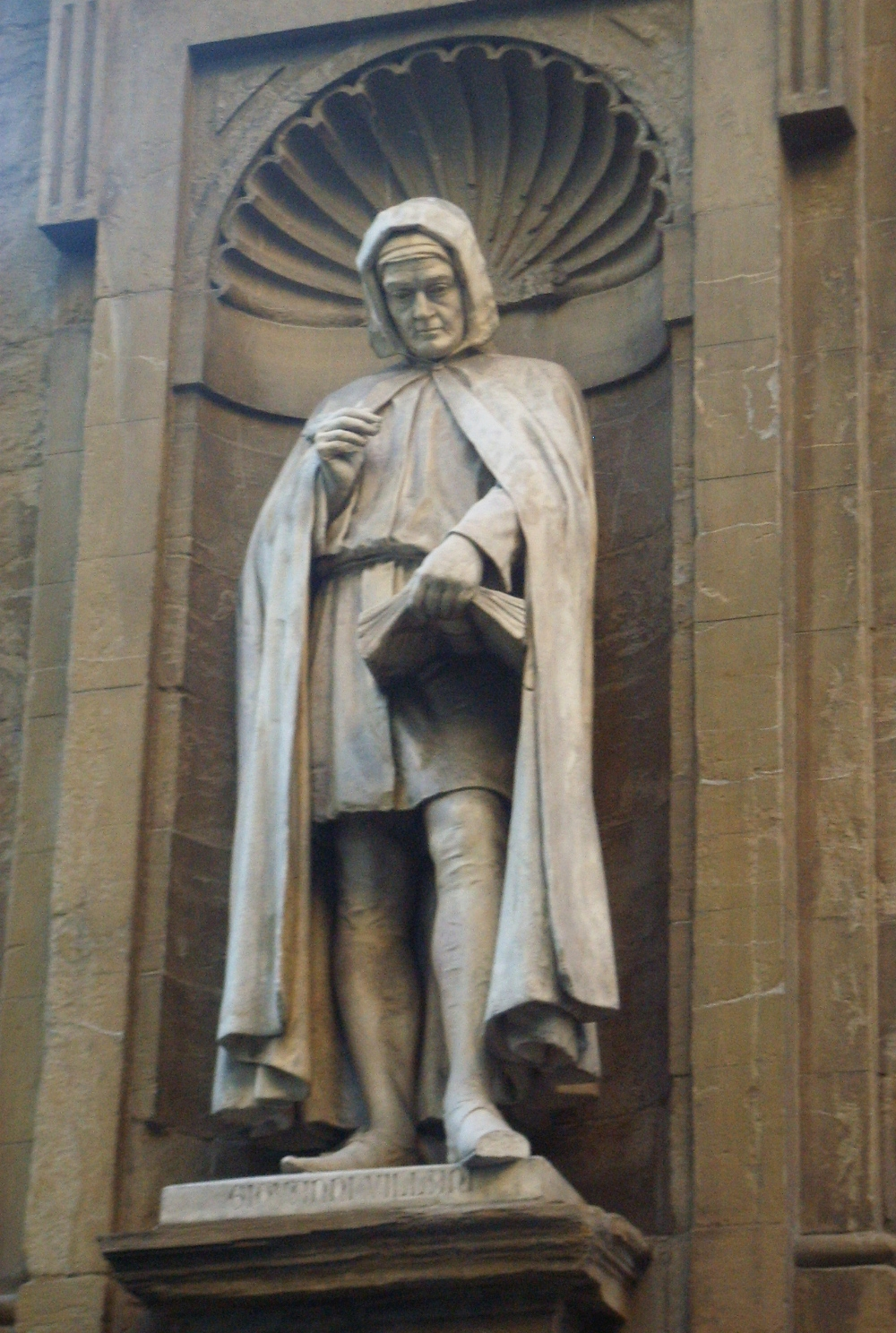
Statue of Giovanni Villani in the Loggia del Mercato Nuovo in Florence

Giovanni Villani's Cronica is divided into twelve books; the first six deal with the largely legendary history of Florence, starting at conventionally Biblical times to 1264. The second phase, in six books, covers the history from 1264 until his own time, all the way up to 1346. Villani outlines the events in his Cronica, not by theme, but through year-to-year accounts; for this, he has gained criticism over the years for writing in an episodic manner lacking a unifying theme or point of view. Villani's chronicles are intercut with historical episodes reported just as he heard them, with little interpretation; this often led to historical inaccuracies in his work, making most of his mistakes in the biographies of historical or contemporary people living outside of Florence (even with well-known monarchs). However, his description of such events as the Battle of Crécy in 1346 was fairly accurate according to historian Kelly DeVries. Both Kenneth R. Bartlett and Louis Green state that Villani's Cronica represented a departure from medieval chronicles in that a more modernistic approach was taken in describing events and statistics, yet still medieval in that Villani relied on divine providence to explain the outcome of events.

== Notable passages ==
=== Battle of Montaperti, 1260 ===
In his Cronica, Villani writes that the Guelph defeat by the Ghibellines at Montaperti in 1260 was a major setback to the historical progress of the Republic of Florence. In this civil war, the Guelphs were a faction united with the papacy in Rome, while the Ghibellines were allied with the descendants of Emperor Frederick II of the Holy Roman Empire and supported by Siena. According to Villani, the Florentine Guelphs' last stand was in defending the Carroccio, a chariot which symbolized the independence of the Commune of Florence. Villani estimated that 2,500 Florentine troops were killed and 1,500 captured during the battle, which Roberta J.M. Olson states are conservative numbers in regards to subsequent historians writing of the battle's casualties.

=== Florence Cathedral, 1296 ===
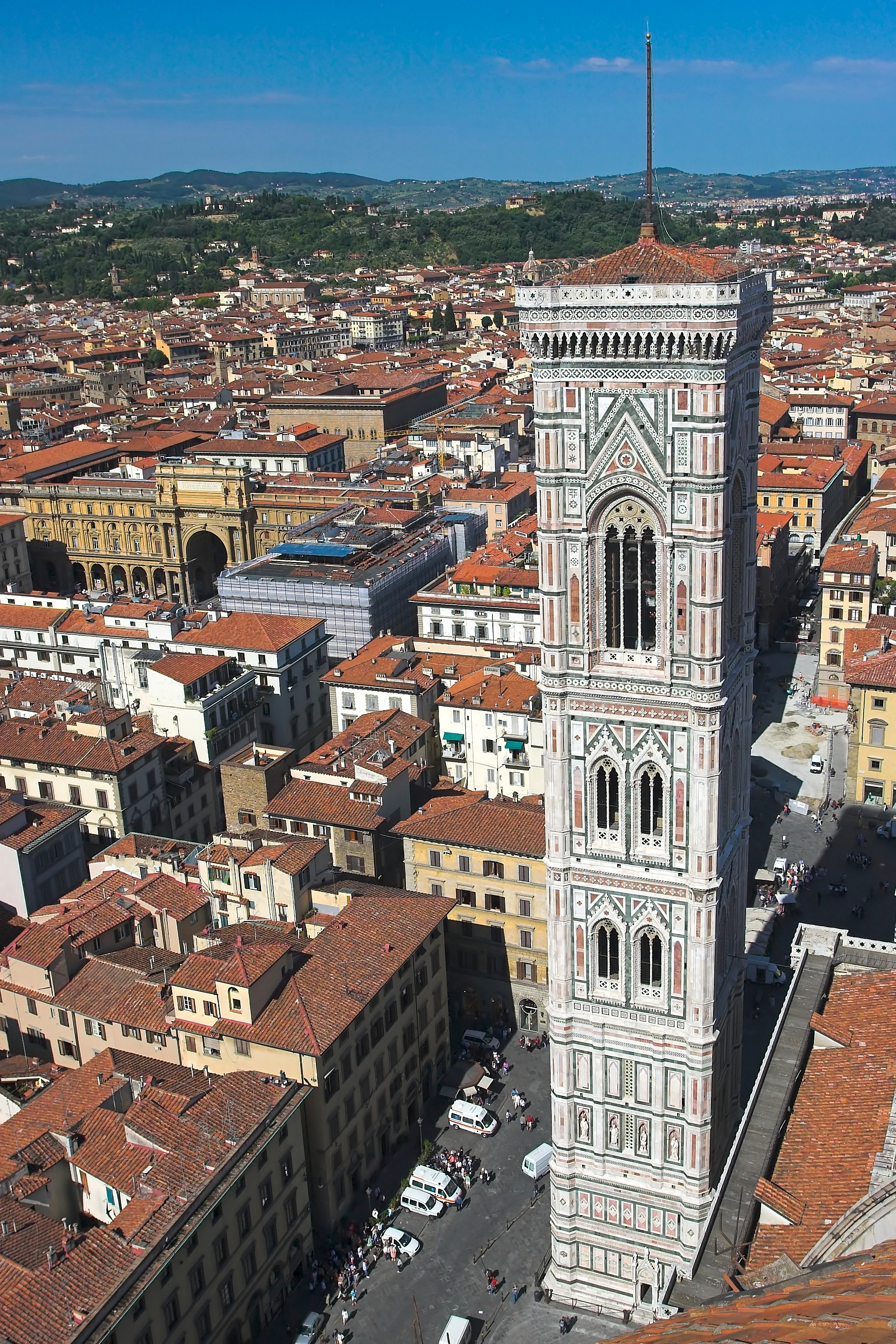
Florence Cathedral

Villani describes the rebuilding of Florence after the 1293 rebellion of one Giano della Bella; he notes that by 1296 conditions were once again in a "tranquil state". He states that the citizens of Florence were discontented with the small stature of their cathedral, one that did not fit the greatness of their city, and so agreed in 1296 to expand and renew the building. A new foundation was laid in September of that year, adding new marble and sculptural figures. Villani mentions the cardinal legate sent by the Pope in Rome who laid the first stone of the foundation, a significant event since it was the first papal legate to visit Florence. Villani relates that for the construction of the church, it was required of the Commune of Florence that a subsidy of four denari on each libra be paid out of the city treasury in addition to a head-tax of two soldi for each adult male. On July 18, 1334, work began on the new campanile (bell tower) of the cathedral, the first stone placed by the bishop of Florence in front of an audience of clergy, priors, and other magistrates. Villani notes that the commune chose "our fellow-citizen Giotto" as the designer of the tower, a man who was "the most sovereign master of painting in his time".

=== Palazzo Vecchio, 1299 ===
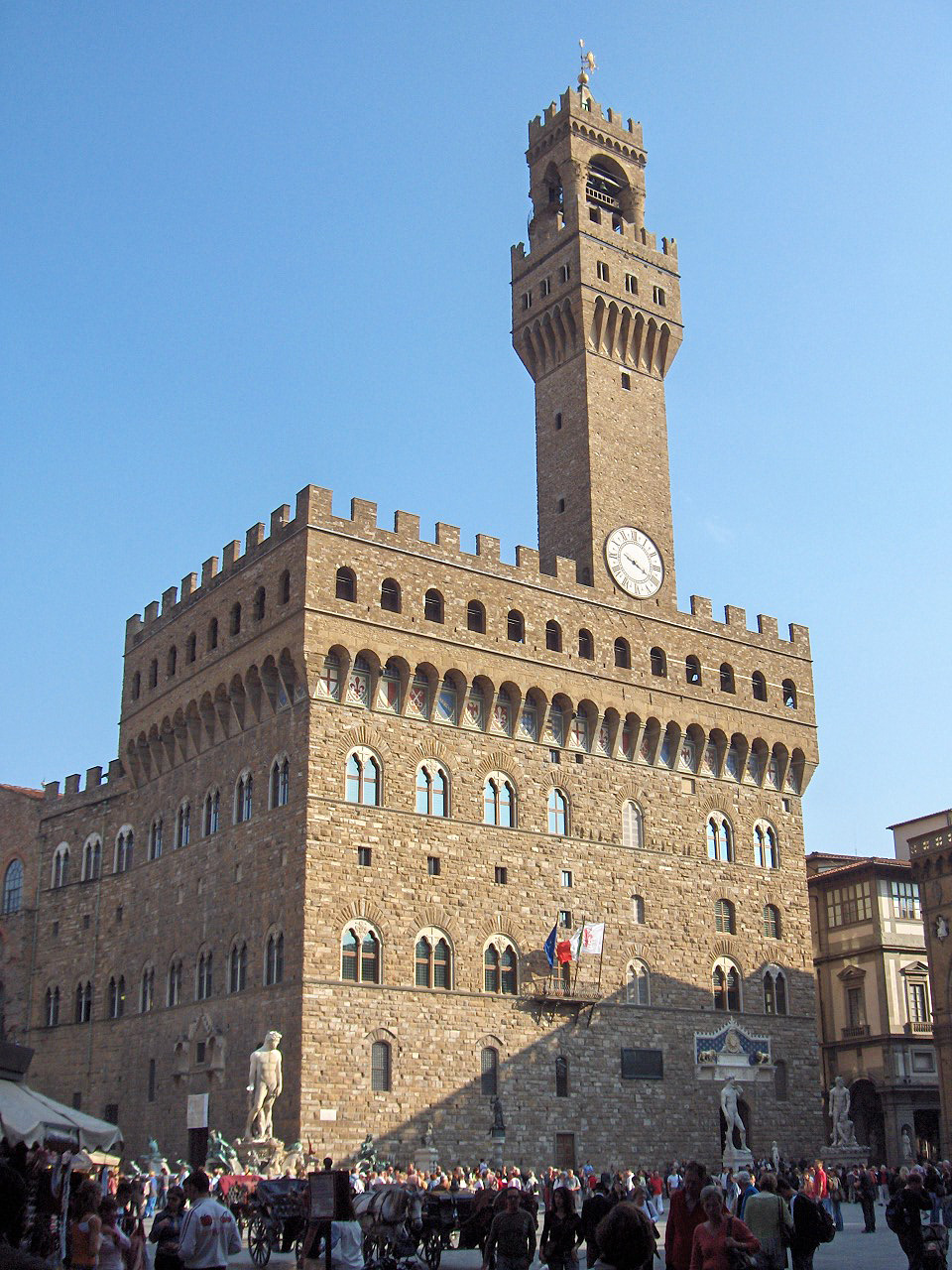
Palazzo Vecchio

According to Villani, in 1299, the commune and people of Florence laid the foundation for the Palazzo Vecchio, to replace the town hall that was located in a house behind the church of San Brocolo. The new Palazzo Vecchio was to serve as a protective municipal palace for the priors and magistrates, shielding them from the factional strife of the Guelphs and Ghibellines as well as the brawls between the people and magnates over the renewal of the priors every two months. The Uberti family houses had formerly stood at the location of the new piazza, but the Uberti were "rebels of Florence and Ghibellines" and thus the plaza was intentionally laid upon the former location of their homes so they could never be rebuilt. According to Villani, the Uberti family was not even allowed to return to Florence. In planning for the large expanse of the plaza, the commune of Florence purchased the homes of citizens such as the Foraboschi family, so that they could be demolished to make room for construction. In fact, the main tower of the Palazzo was built upon a previously existing tower of the Foraboschi family known as "La Vacca" or "The Cow".

=== Trend of building country homes, early 14th century ===
Villani boasts of Florence's pristine architecture in its monasteries and churches, as well as its ornate houses and beautiful palaces. His opinion is clear even in the title of the chapter he devotes to this topic, "More on the greatness and status and magnificence of the city of Florence". However, Villani is quick to add that those who spent too much on the lavish excesses of continuous remodelling and refurnishing of homes were sinners and could be "considered crazy because of their extravagant spending". Villani also describes the growing trend in the early 14th century of affluent Florentine citizens building large country homes far outside the walls of Florence, in the hills of Tuscany.

=== Works sponsored by Robert of Naples, 1316 ===
While holding the signoria of Florence, Robert of Naples (1277–1343) had the eastern part of the Bargello in Florence constructed, where he had his vicar the Count of Battifolle reside. Villani writes in 1316 that Robert's vicar oversaw the construction of a large part of the new palace, which would suggest Robert's vicar had a great amount of influence in the construction of the eastern addition of the Palazzo del Podestà, including its Magdalen Chapel.

=== Famine of 1328 ===
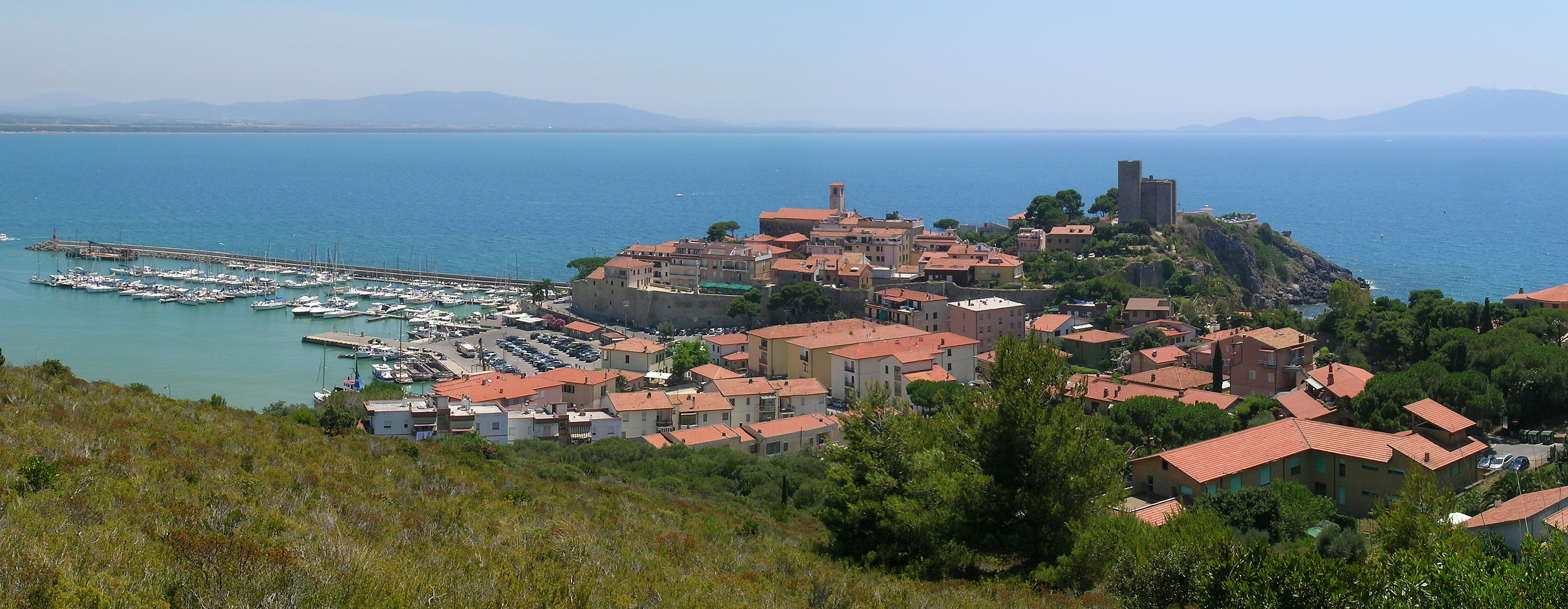
Talamone, where the Florentines imported emergency food supplies from Sicily during the famine of 1347

There was a famine in 1328 which not only devastated Florence, but caused the people of Perugia, Siena, Lucca, and Pistoia to turn away any beggars who approached their towns because they could not provide them with food. Villani reports that Florence did not turn away beggars, but cared for anyone who approached the city and was in need of immediate subsistence. According to Villani, the Florentines sought grain from Sicily, having it brought into port at Talamone and transporting all the way to Florence at great expense. Florence also sought aid and food supplies from Romagna and Arezzo. Villani writes of the bread riots of the poor who could not afford a whole staio of wheat with their meager salaries:

...as long as the scarcity lasted, disregarding the heavy charge upon the public purse, it kept the price of the staio at half a gold florin [which would be two and a half times the normal figure] although to affect this reduction it permitted the wheat to be mixed to one-fourth its volume with coarser grain. In spite of all the government did, the agitation of the people at the market of Or San Michele was so great that it was necessary to protect the officials by means of guards fitted out with ax and block to punish rioters on the spot with the loss of hands or feet.

Villani states that the commune of Florence spent more than 60,000 gold florins to mitigate this effects of this disaster. In order to save their own funds and calm the rage of the riotous poor, all the baker's ovens in the city were requisitioned by the commune and a loaf of bread weighing 170 g (6 oz) was then sold at a meager four pennies. This price was fixed in consideration that poor workers who made only eight to twelve pennies a day could now buy enough bread to survive.

Villani also describes in vivid detail the effects of another widespread famine in Tuscany during the year 1347, which killed an estimated 4,000 people in Florence a year before the Bubonic Plague.

=== Fires of 1331 and 1332 ===
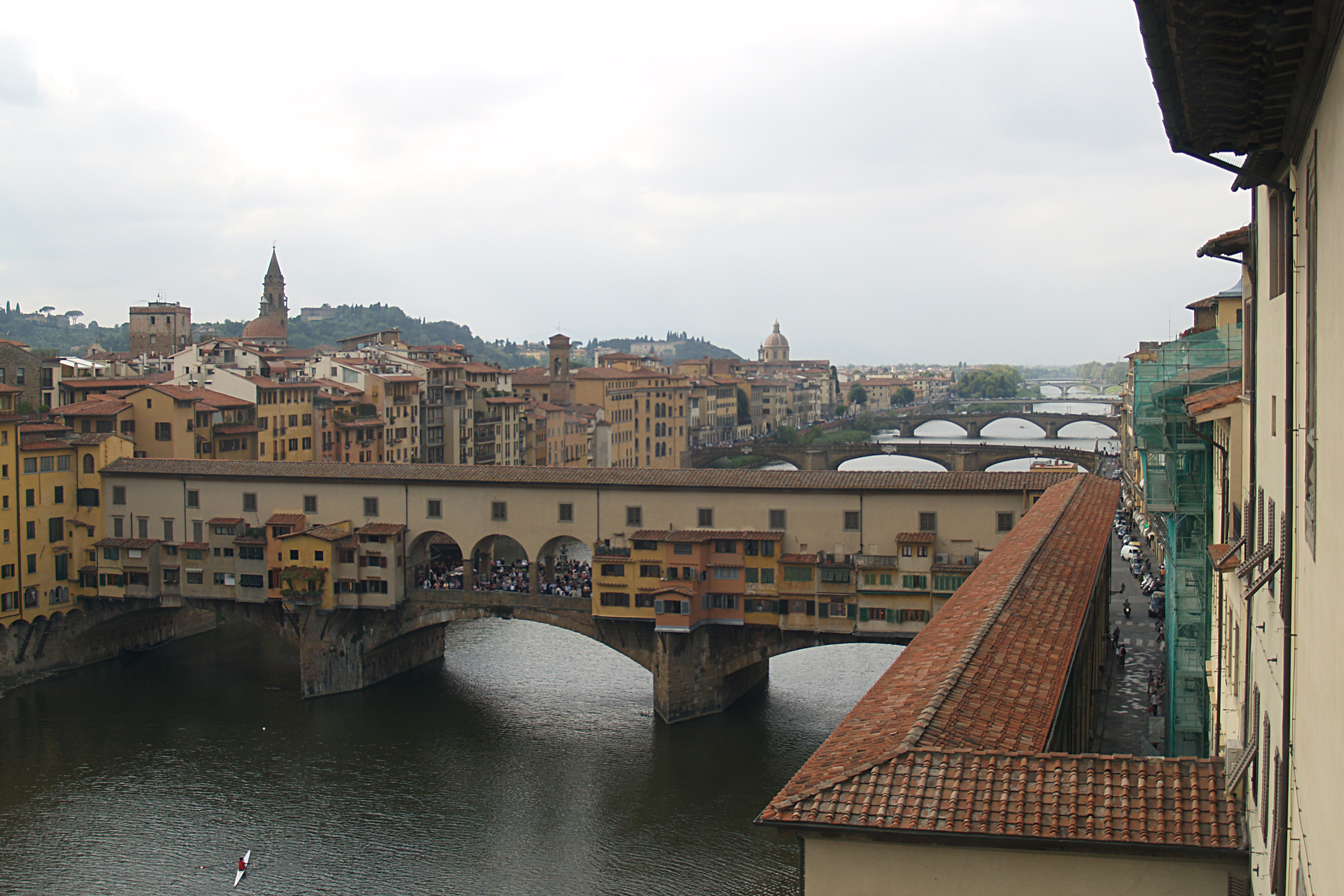
Ponte Vecchio

On June 23, 1331, a fire broke out toward the left bank of the Ponte Vecchio bridge, destroying all twenty shops located on the bridge. Villani notes that this was a heavy loss to local craftsmen of Florence, while two craftsman apprentices died in the fire. On September 12 of that same year a fire broke out at the household of the Soldanieri, killing six people in a house of carpenters and a blacksmith that was located near the church of Santa Trinità.

On February 28, 1332, a fire broke out in the palace of the podestà, the leading magistrate of the city. This fire destroyed the roof of the palace and destroyed two-thirds of the entire structure from the ground floor up, prompting the government to rebuild the palatial residence totally out of stone, all the way up to the roof. On July 16 of that year the palace of the wool guild caught fire and everything from the ground floor up was destroyed, prompting the wool guild to reconstruct a new palatial residence on a larger scale and with stone vaults leading up to the roof.

=== Flood of 1333 ===
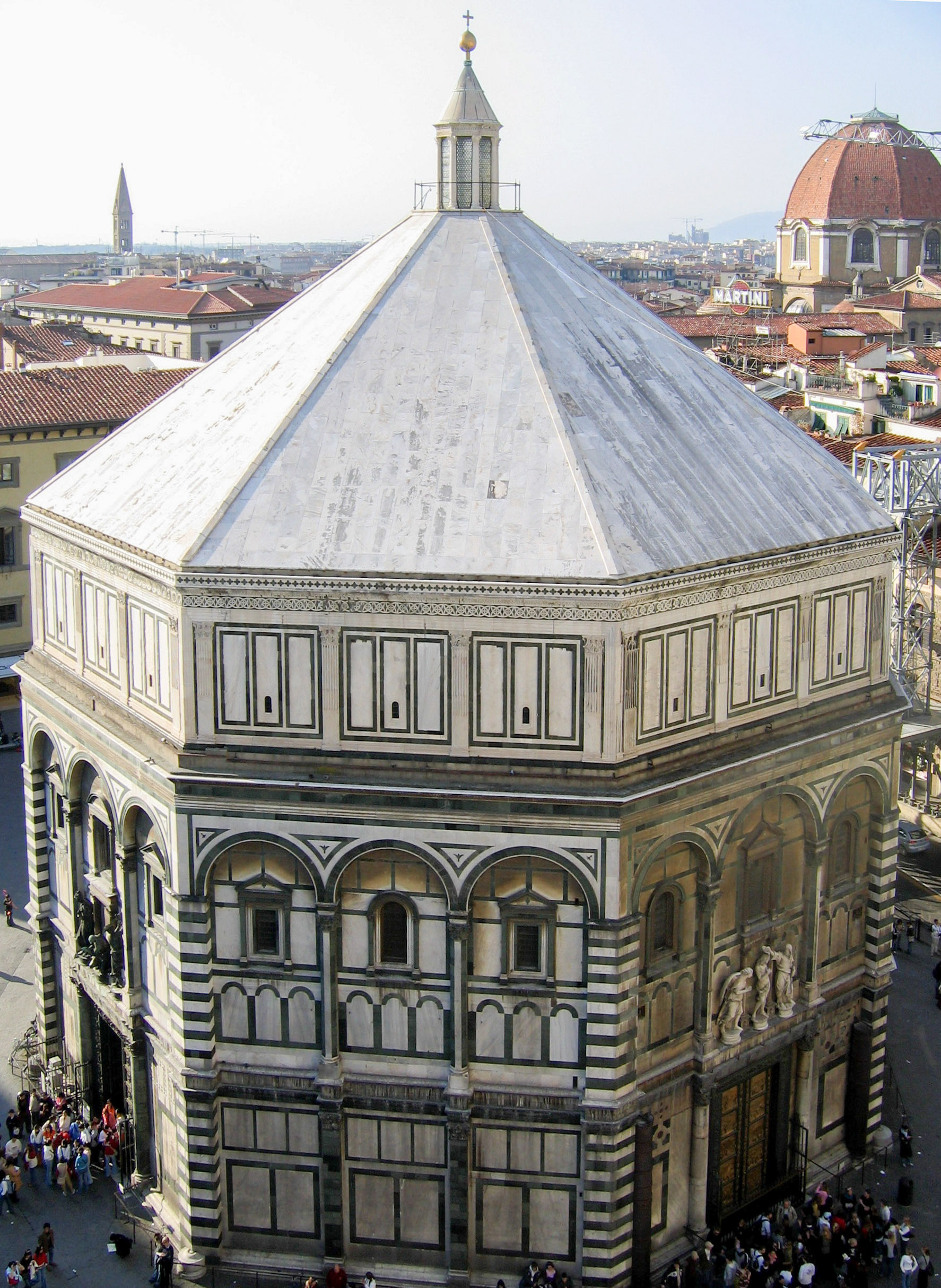
Florence Baptistry

Villani states that by noon on Thursday, November 4, 1333, a flood along the Arno River spread across the entire plain of San Salvi. He wrote that by nightfall the eastern wall of the city that was damming the water became damaged and then washed away in the flood, allowing the flood waters to breach and fill the city streets. He claims that the water rose above the altar in the Florence Baptistry, reaching over half the height of the porphyry columns. Bartlett notes that these columns, presented to Florence by the Pisans more than two hundred years before, have scratched lines to this day indicating the water level reached by the flood in 1333. Villani further claims that the height of the flood water in the courtyard of the commune's palace (residence of the podestà) reached 3 m (10 ft). The Carraia bridge collapsed with the exception of two of its arches, while the Trinità bridge collapsed except for one pier and one arch located towards the church of the Santa Trinità. The Ponte Vecchio—save the two central piers—was swept away when huge logs in the rushing water became clogged around it, allowing the water to build and leap over the arches, states Villani. There was an old statue of Mars that stood on a pedestal near the Ponte Vecchio, but this too was taken by the flood along the Arno.

=== Black Death of 1348 ===
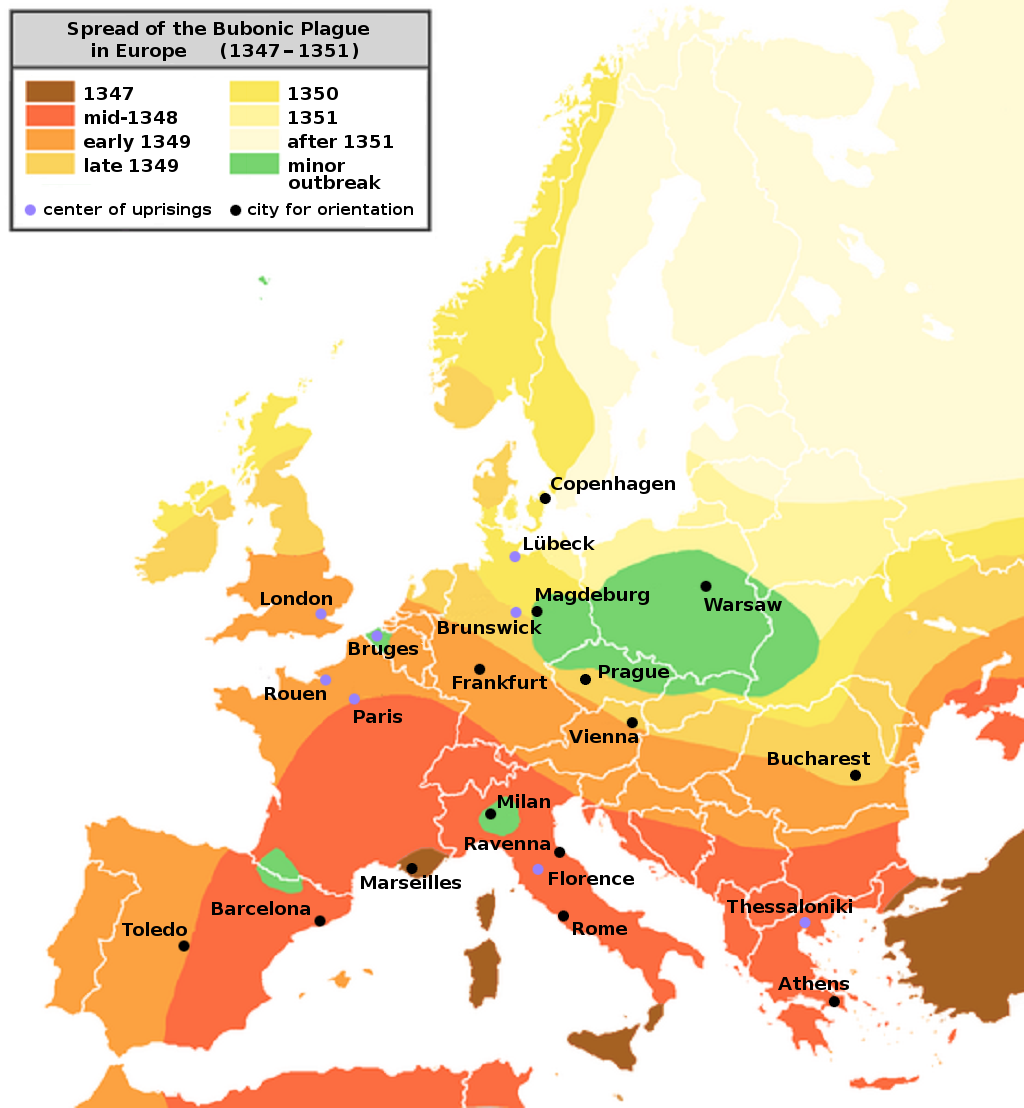
Map showing the spread of bubonic plague in Europe

Villani describes how the plague of Black Death in 1348 was much more widespread amongst the inhabitants of Pistoia, Prato, Bologna, Romagna, Avignon and the whole of France than it was in Florence and Tuscany. He notes that the Black Death also killed many more in Greece, Turkey (Anatolia), in countries amongst the Tartars and in places "beyond the sea", across the whole Levant and Mesopotamia in the areas of Syria and "Chaldea", as well as the islands of Cyprus, Crete, Rhodes, Sicily, Sardinia, Corsica, Elba, and "from there soon reached all the shores of the mainland". Relating the course of events and the sailors from Genoa who brought the plague to mainland Europe, Villani writes:

And of eight Genoese galleys which had gone to the Black Sea only four returned, full of infected sailors, who were smitten one after the other on the return journey. And all who arrived at Genoa died, and they corrupted the air to such an extent that whoever came near the bodies died shortly after. And it was a disease in which there appeared certain swellings in the groin and under the armpit, and the victims spat blood, and in three days they were dead. And the priest who confessed the sick and those who nursed them so generally caught the infection that the victims were abandoned and deprived of confession, sacrament, medicine, and nursing. . .And many lands and cities were made desolate. And this plague lasted till. . .

Villani was unable to complete this last sentence, since he himself died of the plague while writing the Cronica.

== Municipal statistics ==
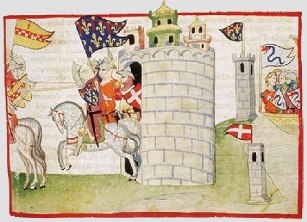
A 14th-century illuminated manuscript version of the chronicle

Giovanni Villani recorded many statistics associated with the city of Florence. This included—but certainly wasn't limited to—figures such as 80 banks located in the city, 146 bakeries, 80 members in an association of city judges with 600 notaries, 60 some physicians and surgical doctors, and 100 some shops and dealers of spices. Each week the city consumed 13,200 bushels of grain while the city annually consumed 4,000 oxen and calves, 60,000 mutton and sheep, 20,000 goats, and 30,000 pigs. He wrote that annually, in the month of July, some 4,000 melons were imported through Porta San Friano.

=== Population ===
Villani states that the whole population of Florence—men, women, and children—in reference to the years 1336 to 1338, was estimated to be 90,000 due to the amount of bread needed daily. Villani recorded an exact figure of 94,000 residents (which he says was very reliable data that included even the poor) in April 1347, a year before the Black Death. A black bean was deposited for every male child baptized and a white bean deposited for every female child baptized in the Florence Baptistry—from these baptisms the average annual birth rate was figured at 5,500 to 6,000. Villani pointed out that the newborn males often outnumbered the newborn females by 300 to 500 on each count. He noted that in his day the adult, male citizen population of the city was about 25,000 (those between the age of fifteen and seventy who could bear arms); 1,500 of these were noble and upper class citizens. Giovanni Villani stated that at all times there were about 1,500 foreigners, transients, and soldiers in the city.

=== Education ===
Besides population statistics, Villani also offered statistics on education. He wrote that boys and girls learning to read numbered 8,000 to 10,000 each year. There were 1,000 to 1,200 children learning to use the abacus and algorism for mathematics. In the four large, prestigious schools of Florence, there were always 550 to 600 students in attendance to learn proper grammar and scholastic logic.

=== Religious facilities ===
Villani also offered statistics on religious and health facilities. The total number of churches in Florence and its suburbs was 110—including 57 parishes, five abbeys with two priors and 80 monks each, 24 nunneries with some 500 women, 10 orders of friars, and 30 hospitals with over 1,000 beds to offer to the sick and dying. Overall there were 250 to 350 chaplain priests in the city.

=== Commerce and trade ===
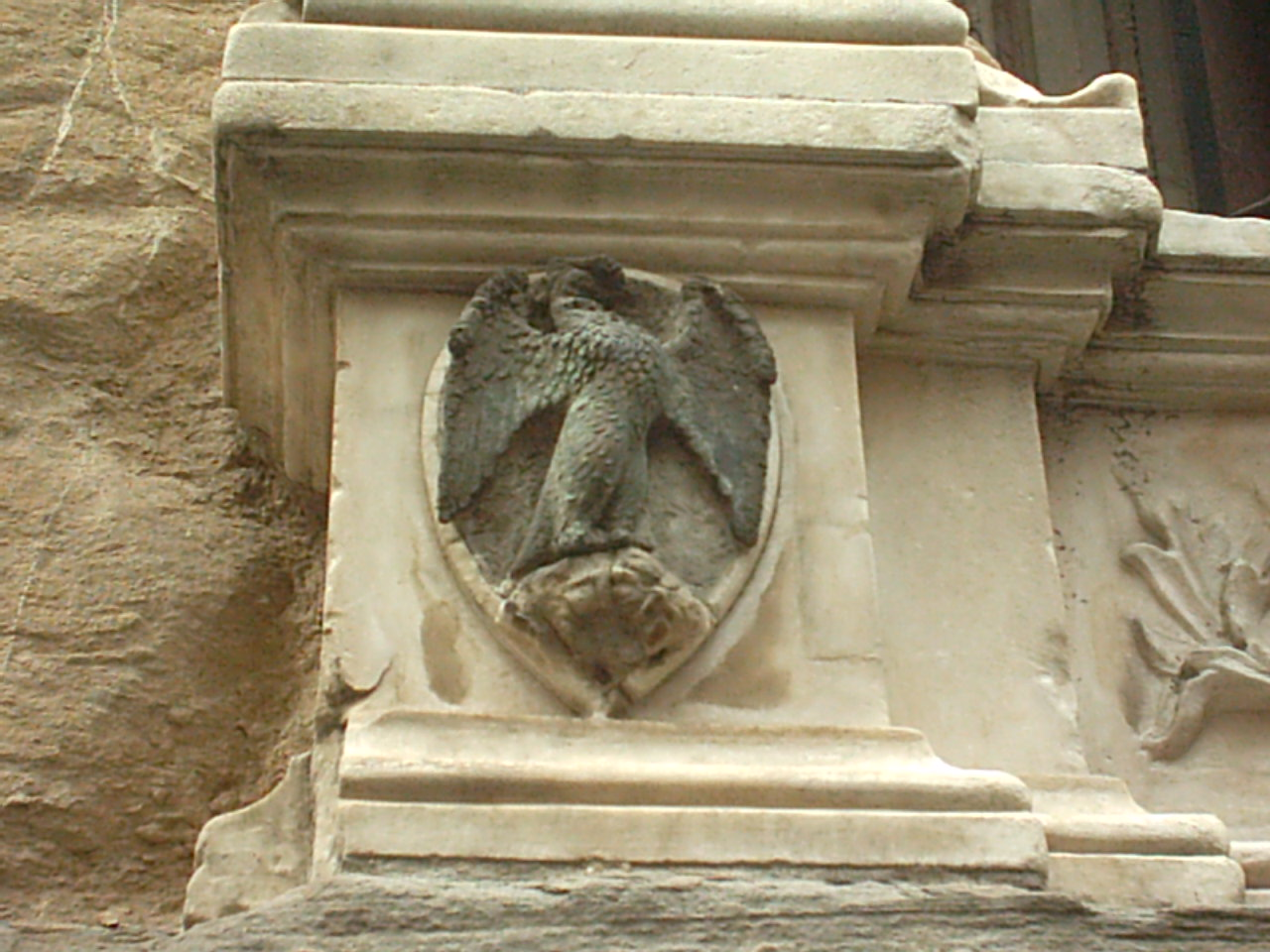
Coat of arms for the Arte di Calimala, the guild which Giovanni Villani belonged to

Besides religious facilities, Villani also provided information on commerce and trade. He states that there were about 200 workshops overseen by the Arte della Lana (guild of wool merchants and entrepreneurs in the woolen industry) of Florence. He states that these workshops produced some 70,000 to 80,000 pieces of cloth a year, with a total worth of 1,200,000 gold florins. He states that a third of this sum "remained in the land" as a reward for labor, while 30,000 people lived from this sum of money. Giovanni notes that earlier in Florence there were actually 300 workshops producing 100,000 pieces of cloth annually, but these were of coarser quality and lesser value (before the importation and knowledge of English wool). Giovanni noted that the rise of the Florentine wool industry in the 13th century came about with this shift from producing a mass of cheap woolen products to high-margin luxury fabrics produced in limited qualities with high demand.

The guild of the Arte di Calimala (importers, refinishers, and sellers of French and Transalpine cloth) annually imported 10,000 pieces of cloth worth 300,000 gold florins; these were sold on the streets of Florence, while a large but unknown amount was exported back out of Florence. There was a large flux of international traders entering Florence, so much so that Villani states all attempts at creating market fairs in the early 14th century failed because "there always is a market in Florence."

=== Knights and the ordinances ===
Villani states that there were only 75 full-dress knights in his day and not 250 knights as in the previous government of Florence, because the popular second government denied the magnates much of their authority and status, "hence few persons were knighted." In 1293, new city ordinances were passed that stated anyone who did not belong to a guild or a council of the captain of the people were to be barred from serving as priors, standard-bearers of justice, or judges. This effectively excluded the powerful magnates of the city from holding important offices, while a prison for magnates was built in 1294, and Giovanni Villani writes that the first magnates punished for failing to adhere to these ordinances were the Galli.

== Legacy ==
The Nuova Cronica by Villani stands as a milestone achievement in the history of European chronicles. Mark Phillips writes that Villani's account provided the basis for the historical works of Leonardo Bruni and Niccolò Machiavelli. Villani's extensive work has also allowed for greater study of his contemporary Dante Alighieri by modern historians. Yet the Nuova Cronica also has its limitations, mostly with relying on inaccurate accounts of eras preceding its compilation. Earlier chronicles, such as the Chronica de origine civitatis of 1231, provided little substantive or factual material, relying instead on legendary accounts and not venturing to analyze their historicity or question their validity. The historian Nicolai Rubinstein called Villani's chronicle a much more "mature expression" of validated Florentine history, yet Villani still relied on the Chronica de origine civitatis for covering events of Florence's earliest history; hence he adopted some of the highly questionable legendary accounts as true historical events. Although Villani's work is most reliable when it comes to historical events that occurred within his lifetime, there are some factual errors even in the contemporary biographies he presented. Kenneth R. Bartlett writes that Villani's interest and elaboration in economic details, statistical information, and political and psychological insight signifies him as a more modern late medieval chronicler of Europe. However, he adds that Villani's reliance upon divine providence aligned him more with the medieval tradition of chroniclers than the more credible historians of the Renaissance.

== See also ==
- List of literary descriptions of cities (before 1550)
