= Dino Compagni =

Dino Compagni (c. 1255 – 26 February 1324) was an Italian historical writer and political figure.

Dino is an abridgement of Aldobrandino or Ildebrandino. He was born into a popolano or prosperous family of Florence, supporters of the White party of the Guelphs. Dino was active in Florentine politics serving as consul for the guild of traders, and later as member of the Signory twice, Prior, and Gonfalonier of Justice. He was democratic in feeling, and was a supporter of the new Ordinances of Justice of Giano della Bella.

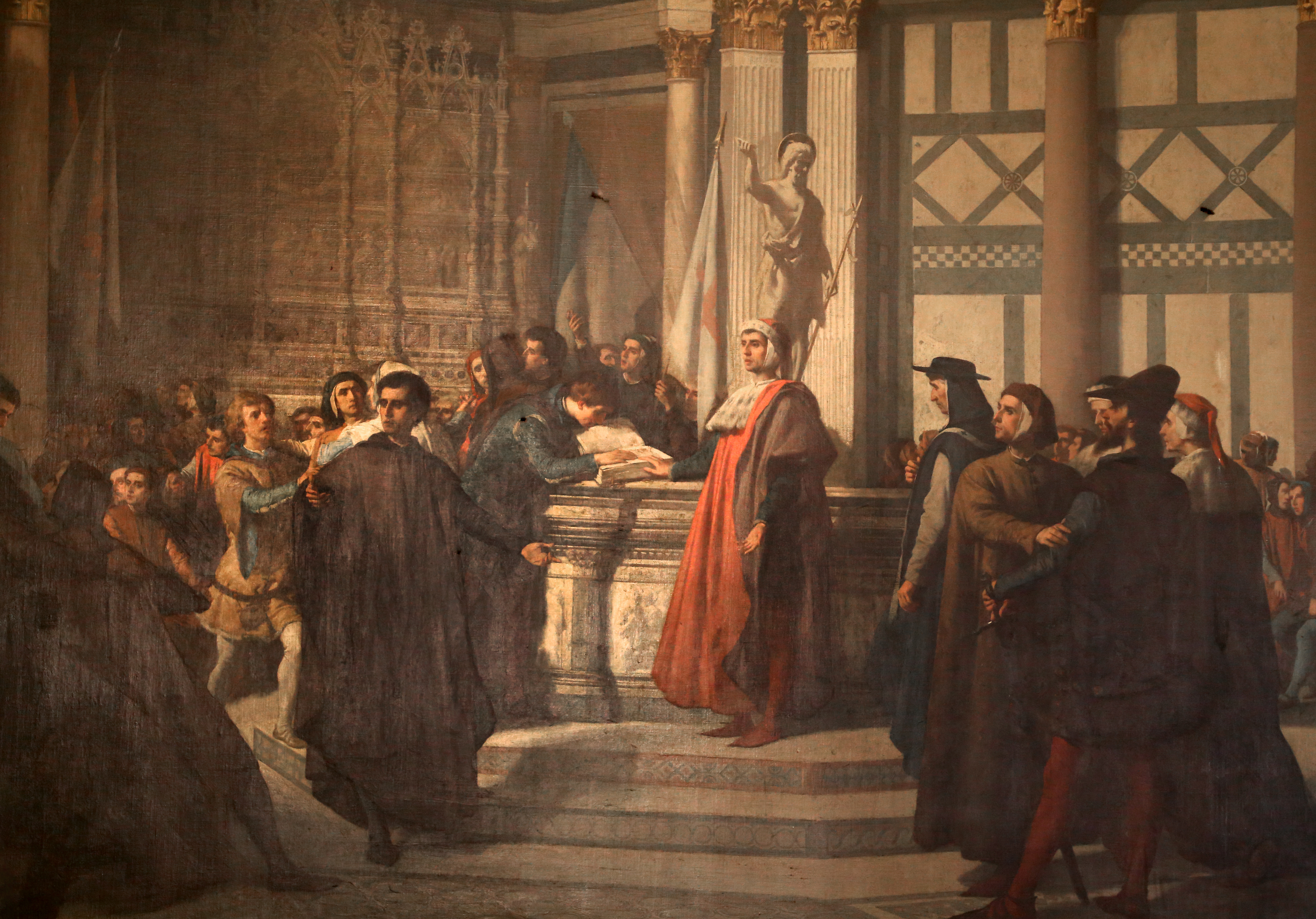
Compagni advocates for peace between Guelphs and Ghibellines in a sermon in church of San Giovanni by Antonio Puccinelli.

After November 1301, when the White faction lost the power of the Signory to the Black (Ghibelline) party, Dino never again served in a Government council. Because he had been a prior, his property was not forfeit; he was not sent into exile, as other members of the White faction were. When Charles of Valois, the nominee of Boniface VIII, was expected in Florence, Compagni, foreseeing the evils of civil discord, assembled a number of citizens in the church of San Giovanni, and tried to quiet their excited spirits.

His Cronica relates the events that came under his own notice from 1280 to 1312. It bears the stamp of a strong subjectivity. The narrative is constantly personal. Compagni is more of a historian than a chronicler, because he looks for the reasons of events, and makes profound reflections on them. He is one of the important authorities for that period of Florentine history, notwithstanding the mistakes of fact which are to be found in his writings.

During the 1870s, Karl von Hegel and Paul Scheffer-Boichorst participated in a debate about the authenticity of his chronicle, publishing several papers with their arguments. Hegel argued for the authenticity of Compagni's chronicle, and was right.

== See also ==
- Giovanni Villani
