= Giano della Bella =

Italian politician (ca. 1240-ca. 1300)

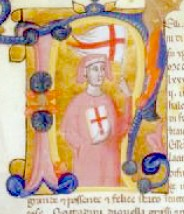
Della Bella holding the banner of the newly created position of the Gonfaloniere of Justice. Taken from the oldest manuscript of the Nuova Cronica (mid 14th century).

Giano Della Bella (c. 1240 Florence - France, before 19 April 1306) was a late thirteenth century Florentine politician and a leader of the revolt that brought in the Ordinances of Justice which entrenched the power of the Florentine guilds by excluding aristocrats from power in Florence.

He was born in the family castle within Florence into a Ghibelline (pro Holy Roman Emperor) family, although he became a Guelph and a populist.

In 1294 he was podestà of Pistoia. He is the protagonist of the first chapters of Dino Compagni's Nuova Cronica and is also mentioned by Dante in Paradise.

He was of noble birth but also a member of the Arte di Calimala, the wool merchant's guild.
