= Gonfaloniere of Justice =

Senior Florentine official

Gonfaloniere di Giustizia

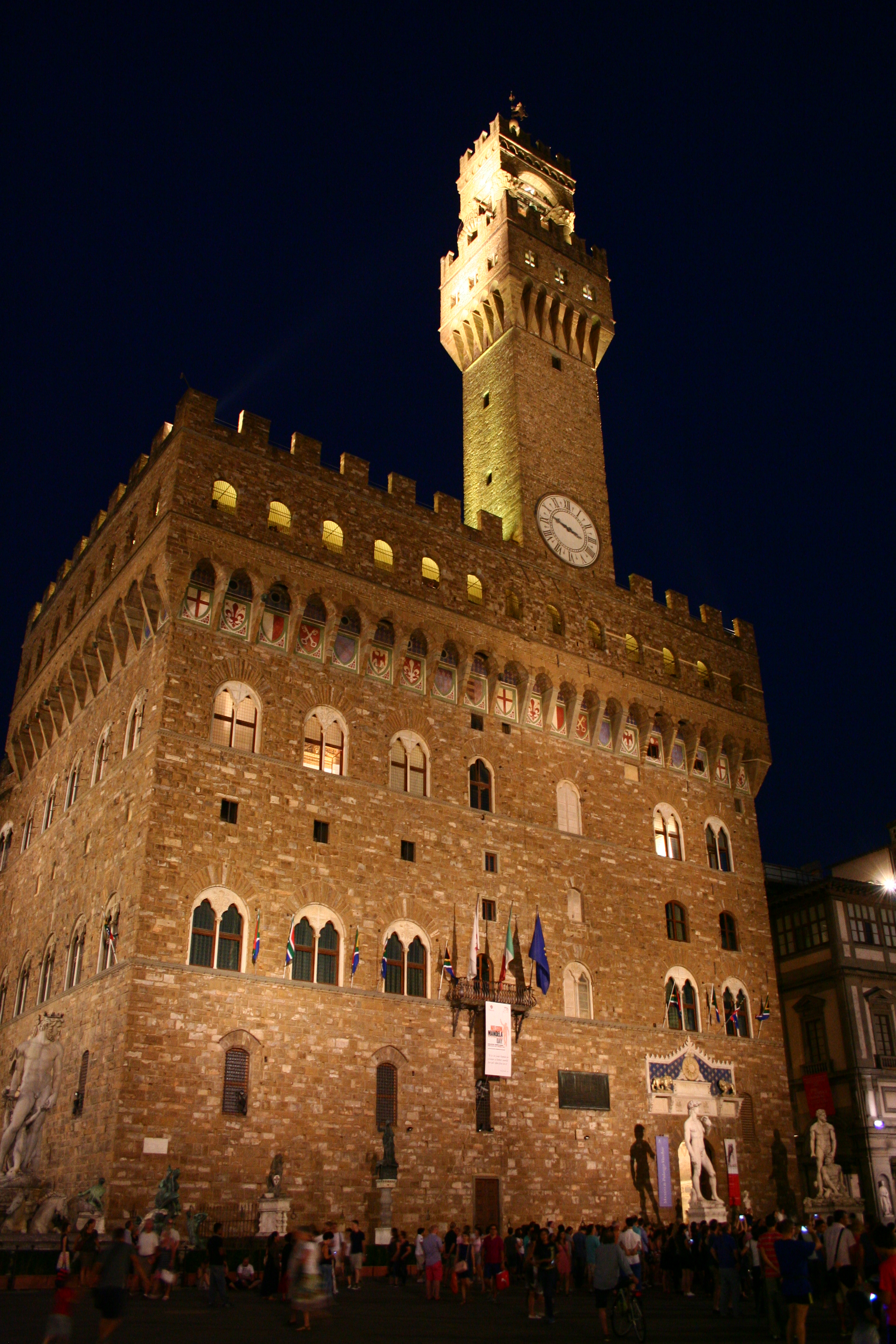
- Palazzo della Signoria, seat of the Gonfaloniere di Giustizia and of the Priory of the Arts
- Residence: Palazzo Vecchio
- Formation: 1293
- First holder: Giano della Bella
- Final holder: Alessandro de' Medici
- Abolished: 1532

Gonfaloniere of Justice (Italian: Gonfaloniere di Giustizia, lit. 'Standard Bearer of Justice') was a post in the government of medieval and early Renaissance Florence. Like Florence's Priori, it was introduced in 1293 when Giano Della Bella's Ordinances of Justice came into force.

He was one of the nine citizens selected by drawing lots every two months, who formed the government, or Signoria. As Gonfaloniere di Giustizia he was the temporary standard-bearer of the Republic of Florence and custodian of the city's banner, which was displayed from the yardarm of a portable cross. Along with the voting rights of the other Priori, he was also in charge of the internal security forces and the maintenance of public order. To distinguish him from his other eight colleagues, his crimson coat, lined with ermine, was further embroidered with golden stars. Each of Florence's neighborhoods, or rioni, had its own priore who might be selected to serve on the council, and its own gonfaloniere di compagnia selected from the first families of each quarter.

== History ==
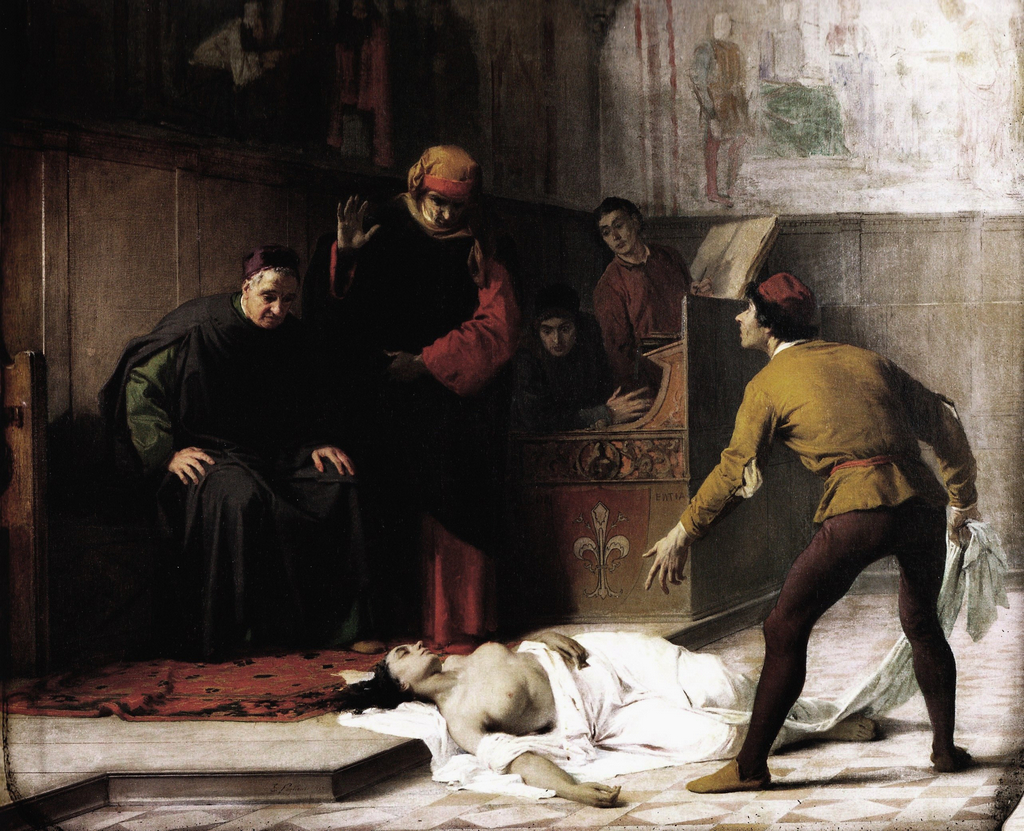
The body of a dead woman is brought before the Gonfaloniere of Justice in 1425, the legendary origin of the Compagnia della Misericordia, by Eleuterio Pagliano

=== Prelude ===
Arms of the families that have held the Gonfaloniere

The gonfaloniere di giustizia in 1366 was Niccolo Brunetti. 13th century Italy was a "land of cities" and Florence was one of the richest and most politically restless among them. The most obvious signs of this prosperity and economic power were its striking of 3.5 gram gold florins and the presence of the city's large mercantile and financier companies right across Europe and Africa. These companies' leaders demanded increasing involvement in the city's political life, claiming equal or greater dignity than the old noble families who held now unproductive rural land outside the town. In the 13th and 14th centuries the Arti Maggiori would be key to the city's economic ascent and the middle class's revenge on the feudal nobility. This state of affairs would last until at least 1347, when the English monarchy's bankruptcy due to its high military expenditure in the Hundred Years' War dragged even the Bardi and Peruzzi businesses (the latter alone owed around 600,000 guilders) into ruin.

=== After the Ordinances ===
The post of Gonfaloniere survived practically until the abolition of the Republican constitution by the Medici on their return to the city in 1530. Indeed, in the 15th century the post was given to many members of the Medici family and their neighbouring and allied families, giving them a kind of recognised power within the republican framework and de facto (though never de jure) allowing them to take over the powers of the other old magistracies.

After the expulsion of Piero the Unfortunate in 1494 and during the brief rule of Girolamo Savonarola (executed in 1498), the Florentine families tried to reorganise the city government on the model of the old communal magistracies. Pier Soderini was in 1502 appointed gonfaloniere for life, but only held it until the end of 1512, when the Medici returned and Piero decided to abandon the city. During his tenure, Soderini held more direct political responsibility than either Cosimo de' Medici or Lorenzo de' Medici. Machiavelli served as his secretary. Although many of the Ottimati or aristocrats had supported Soderini's candidacy for Gonfaloniere a Vita, believing he would support their interests, they turned against him when his popular leanings became clear. In 1512, after fierce resistance to imperial troops under Maximilian I and Pope Julius II, it was finally forced to surrender. This marked the end of the republican system and its offices, with the start of the ascent of the grand-ducal Medici dynasty.

== Bibliography ==
- Franco Cardini, Firenze, la città delle torri, Milano, Fenice, 1995–2000.
- I. Caliari, I protagonisti della civiltà, Edizioni Futuro, 1981.
- Marcello Vannucci, Storia di Firenze, Roma, Newton & Compton, 1992.
