= Torre dei Della Bella =

Tower in Florence, Italy

Coordinates: 43°46′15.31″N 11°15′21.80″E

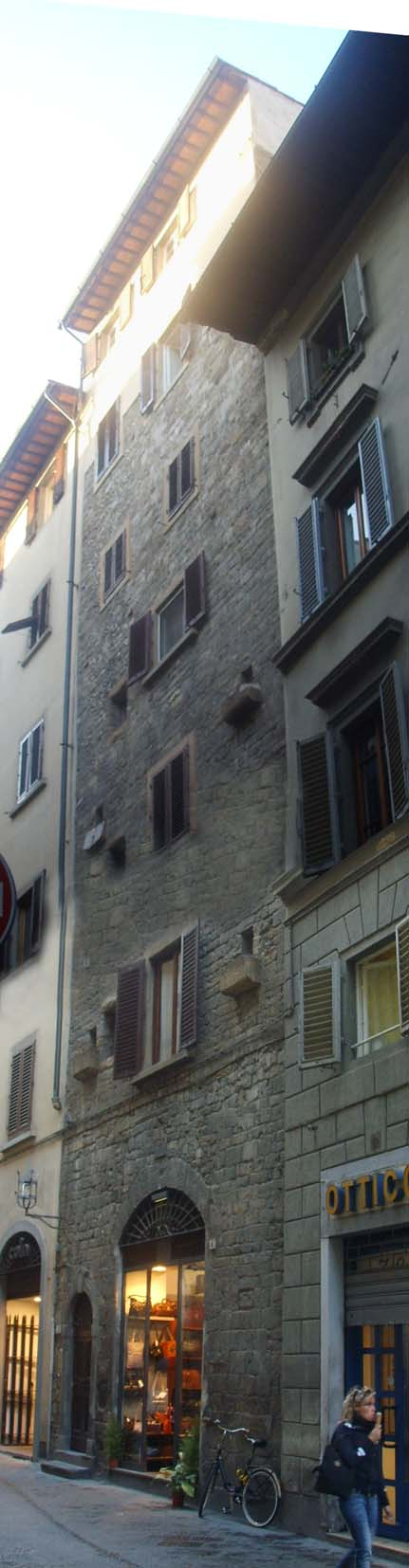
La Torre dei Della Bella

The Torre dei Della Bella (Tower of Della Bella) is an old tower of Florence, Italy and is located in Via dei Tavolini.

The tower is rectangular in plan and fronts the street. The building façade shows the typical rows of stone externally as well as some putlog holes which were used in medieval times as supports for scaffolding (used to complete particularly high construction) or as placement holes for the support beams of exterior balconies.

Owned by an important family that owned the property jointly with others along this road, the tower is the birthplace of Giano della Bella author of the Ordinances of Justice.

The tower is located opposite the Tower of Galigai and very close to the Torre dei Cerchi (Tower of the Circles). An inscription in stone above the large central door shows the old road numbers from the pre-nineteenth century, with Roman numerals LXXII.
