= Giovanni Villani =

Italian banker, diplomat, and chronicler

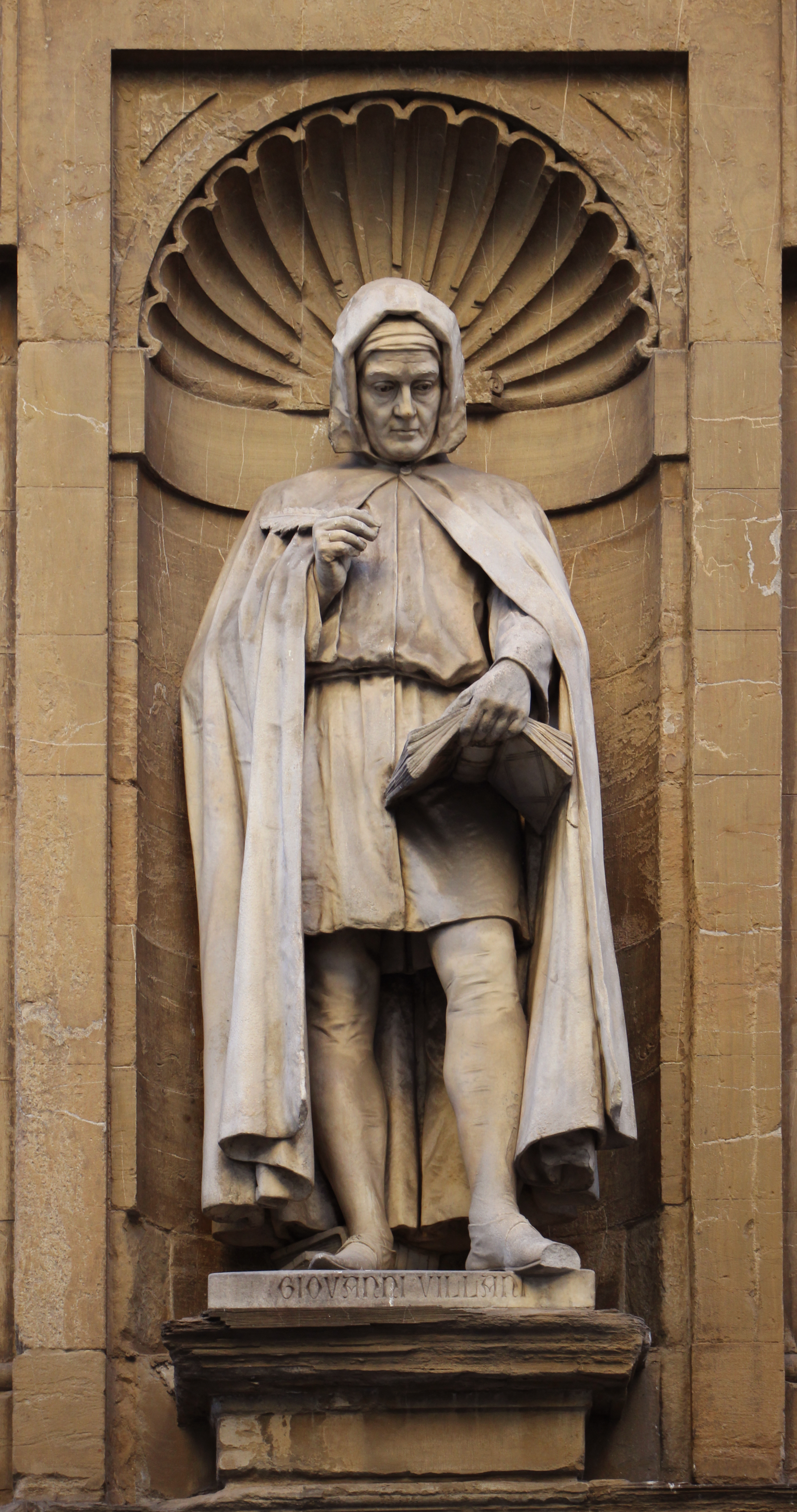
- Statue in the Loggia del Mercato Nuovo in Florence
- Born: c. 1276 or 1280; Florence
- Died: 1348; Florence
- Occupations: Banker; official; diplomat; chronicler

Giovanni Villani (Italian pronunciation: [dʒoˈvanni vilˈlaːni]; c. 1276 or 1280 – 1348) was an Italian banker, official, diplomat and chronicler from Florence who wrote the Nuova Cronica (New Chronicles) on the history of Florence. He was a leading statesman of Florence but later gained an unsavoury reputation and served time in prison as a result of the bankruptcy of a trading and banking company he worked for. His interest in and elaboration of economic details, statistical information, and political and psychological insight mark him as a more modern chronicler of late medieval Europe. His Cronica is viewed as the first introduction of statistics as a positive element in history. However, historian Kenneth R. Bartlett notes that, in contrast to his Renaissance-era successors, "his reliance on such elements as divine providence links Villani closely with the medieval vernacular chronicle tradition." In recurring themes made implicit through significant events described in his Cronica, Villani also emphasized three assumptions about the relationship of sin and morality to historical events, these being that excess brings disaster, that forces of right and wrong are in constant struggle, and that events are directly influenced by the will of God.

Villani was inspired to write his Cronica after attending the jubilee celebration in Rome in 1300 and noting the venerable history of that city. He outlined the events in his Cronica year for year, following a strictly linear narrative format. He provided intricate details on many important historical events of the city of Florence and the wider region of Tuscany, such as construction projects, floods, fires, famines, and plagues.

While continuing work on the Cronica and detailing the enormous loss of life during the Black Death in 1348, Villani died of the same illness. His work on the Cronica was continued by his brother and nephew. Villani's work has received both praise and criticism from modern historians. The criticism is mostly aimed at his emphasis on supernatural guidance of events, his organizational style, and his glorification of the papacy and Florence.

== Life and career ==
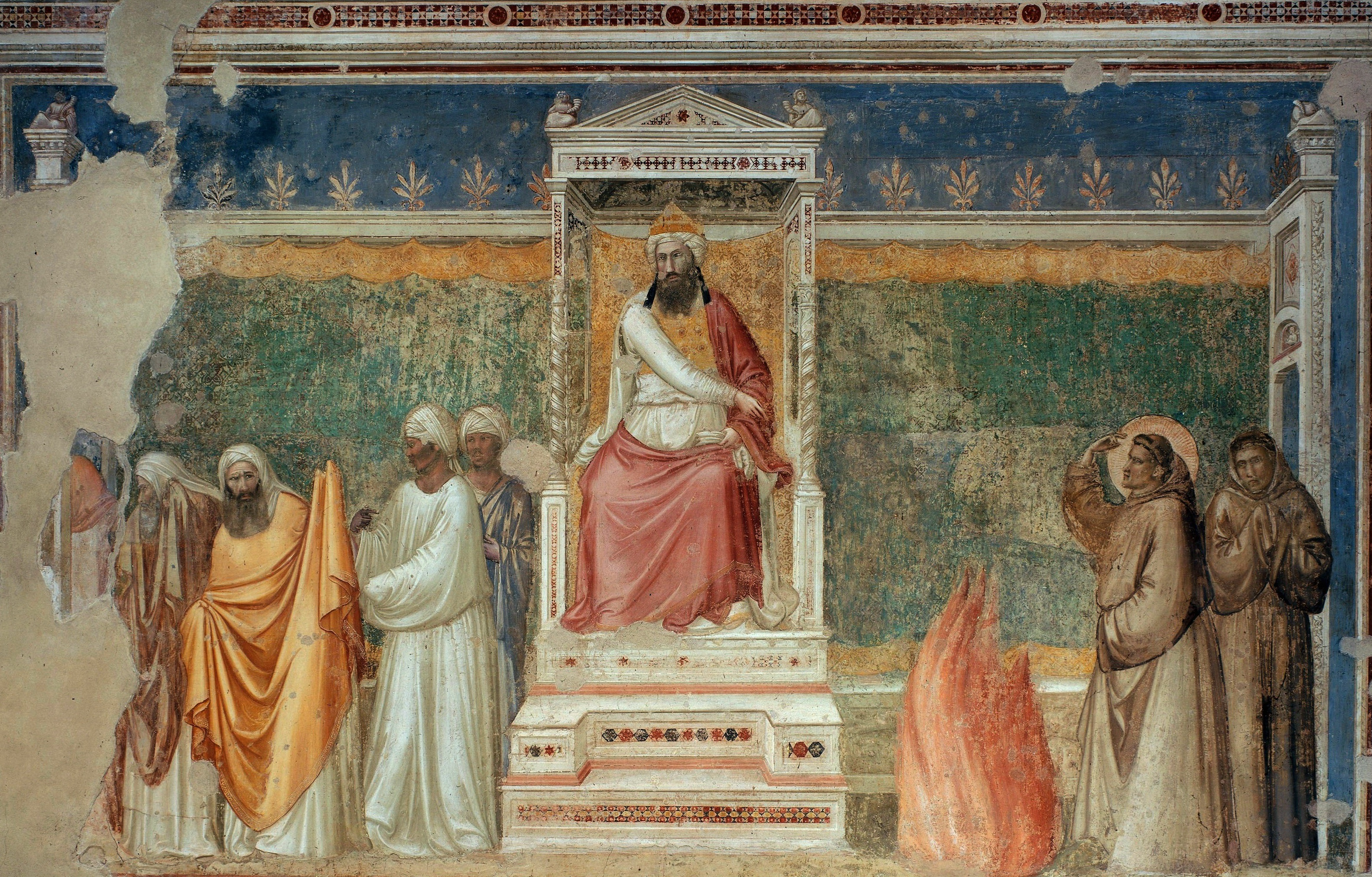
A fresco painting by Giotto di Bondone in the Basilica of Santa Croce, Florence, within the chapel owned by the Bardi bankers; Giotto's artworks were praised by Villani.

Giovanni Villani was born into the Florentine merchant middle class. He was the son of Villano di Stoldi di Bellincione, who came from an old and well-respected arti maggiori family of merchants. Villani was a member of the Arte di Calimala (wool finishers) guild in Florence since 1300, serving on the mercanzia council of eight. During that year he visited Rome during the jubilee celebration. After observing the well-known ancient monuments of Rome and acknowledging its renowned historical personages, he was inspired to write the Cronica, a universal history of Florence in a strictly linear, year-by-year format. During the early years of the 14th century, he gained political perspective by travelling throughout Italy, Switzerland, France and Flanders for the Peruzzi bank, of which he was a shareholder from 1300 to 1308. Traveling abroad as a factor for the company, Villani was paid a regular salary in addition to his shareholding profits. On 15 May 1306, one of the first exchange contracts (cambium) to mention the city of Bruges involved two parties: Giovanni Villani, representing the Peruzzi Company, granting a loan to Tommaso Fini, representing the Gallerani Company of Siena. Villani and his brother Matteo transferred most of their economic activities to the Buonaccorsi firm by 1322. Giovanni Villani was a co-director of Buonaccorsi in 1324. The Buonaccorsi handled banking and commodity trade activities, spreading their influence throughout Italy, France, Flanders, England and several places in the Mediterranean.

Villani returned to Florence in 1307 where he married and settled down for a life of city politics. He became one of the priors of Florence in 1316 and 1317. At the same time, he participated in the crafty diplomatic tactics that resulted in peace with Pisa and Lucca. As head of the mint beginning in 1316, he collected its earlier records and created a register of all the coins struck in Florence. In 1321, he was again chosen prior, and in 1324 was deputed to inspect the rebuilding of the city walls. He went with the Florentine army to fight against Castruccio Castracani, lord of Lucca, and was present at Altopascio during Florence's defeat. In his Cronica, he gave a detailed account of why Florence was unable to acquire Lucca after the death of Castruccio Castracani.

A famine spread across Tuscany in 1328. From 1329 to 1330 Villani was a commune-appointed magistrate of provisioning protecting Florence from the famine's worst effects. In order to mitigate rising levels of starvation and assuage peasant discontent, grain was speedily imported from Sicily through Talamone, 60,000 gold florins were taken from the city purse by the Florentine commune to aid the relief effort, and all the city's bakers had their ovens requisitioned by the government so that loaves of bread could be sold at affordable prices to the riotous and starving poor.

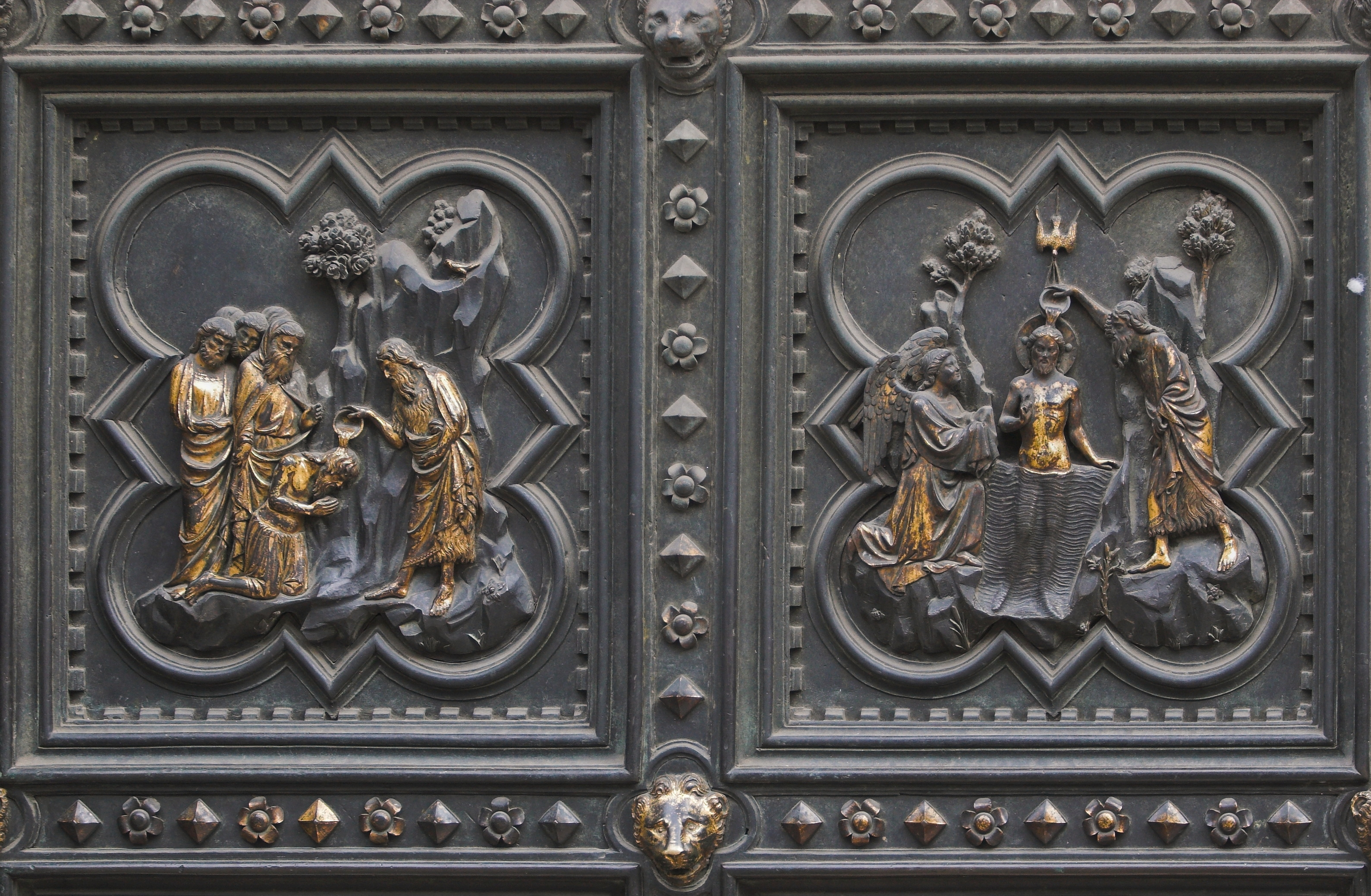
Villani was the superintendent of the construction of Andrea Pisano's bronze doors for the Florence Baptistry.

Villani was sent on another diplomatic mission in 1329, this time to Bologna to meet Cardinal Bertrand de Pouget. From 1330 to 1331 he superintended the making of Andrea Pisano's bronze doors for the Baptistry. At the same time, he served as the consul for his guild of the Arte di Calimala and watched over the raising of the campanile of the Badìa. He was also sent with others as a hostage to Ferrara, to ensure that Florence made good on a debt; he resided there for some months in 1341.

Villani often expressed an optimistic viewpoint in his writing; this changed with the short-lived regime of Walter VI of Brienne, a despot invited to Florence and granted signoria. In fact, after experiencing his own financial troubles, a terminated career, and the failure of Florence in international affairs, and witnessing a host of different natural calamities and the onset of the Black Death in Europe, he became convinced that the apocalypse and final judgement was near. The bankruptcy of the Buonaccorsi Company led to Villani's conviction and imprisonment in 1346, as he was a main partner. Other banking companies also went bankrupt, such as the Peruzzi in 1343 and the Compagnia dei Bardi in 1346 (they were allied in a joint venture by 1336); Villani calculated that before their bankruptcy the Peruzzi had lost some 600,000 florins and the Bardi had lost some 900,000 florins. Although Villani attributed the losses to the companies' massive monetary loans to Edward III of England which were never repaid, historian Edwin S. Hunt suggests that the firms simply lacked the resources to have made such loans, which in all probability were much smaller and were not the key reasons for the companies' failures. The Bardi and Peruzzi were just two of many European banks that Edward III accepted loans from, prominent members of the Bardi and other Florentine families were owed only 63,000 Florins by Edward in 1348, and even a mass of small lenders and investors in Florence could not have made the necessary loan to England. The figure Villani asserted of 400,000 Florins owed to the Peruzzi by Edward alone equalled Villani's estimate for the entire payroll of 30,000 workers of the Florentine cloth industry in 1338. Hunt asserts that the failures of the Florentine banks seems closely tied to the expansionist policy of Florence in Tuscany, hoping that newly conquered territory would yield greater security for their trade with northern Europe, but instead resulted in costly campaigns and little profit. In addition to the questionable figures Villani posed for the Peruzzi and Bardi companies, it is also known that several events described in his Cronica surrounding the Buonaccorsi's bankruptcy were written to deliberately obscure the truth about the company's fraudulent behavior; Miller writes that "this is one of the most convincing conclusions" of historian Michele Luzzati's Giovanni Villani e la Compagnia dei Buonaccorsi (1971).

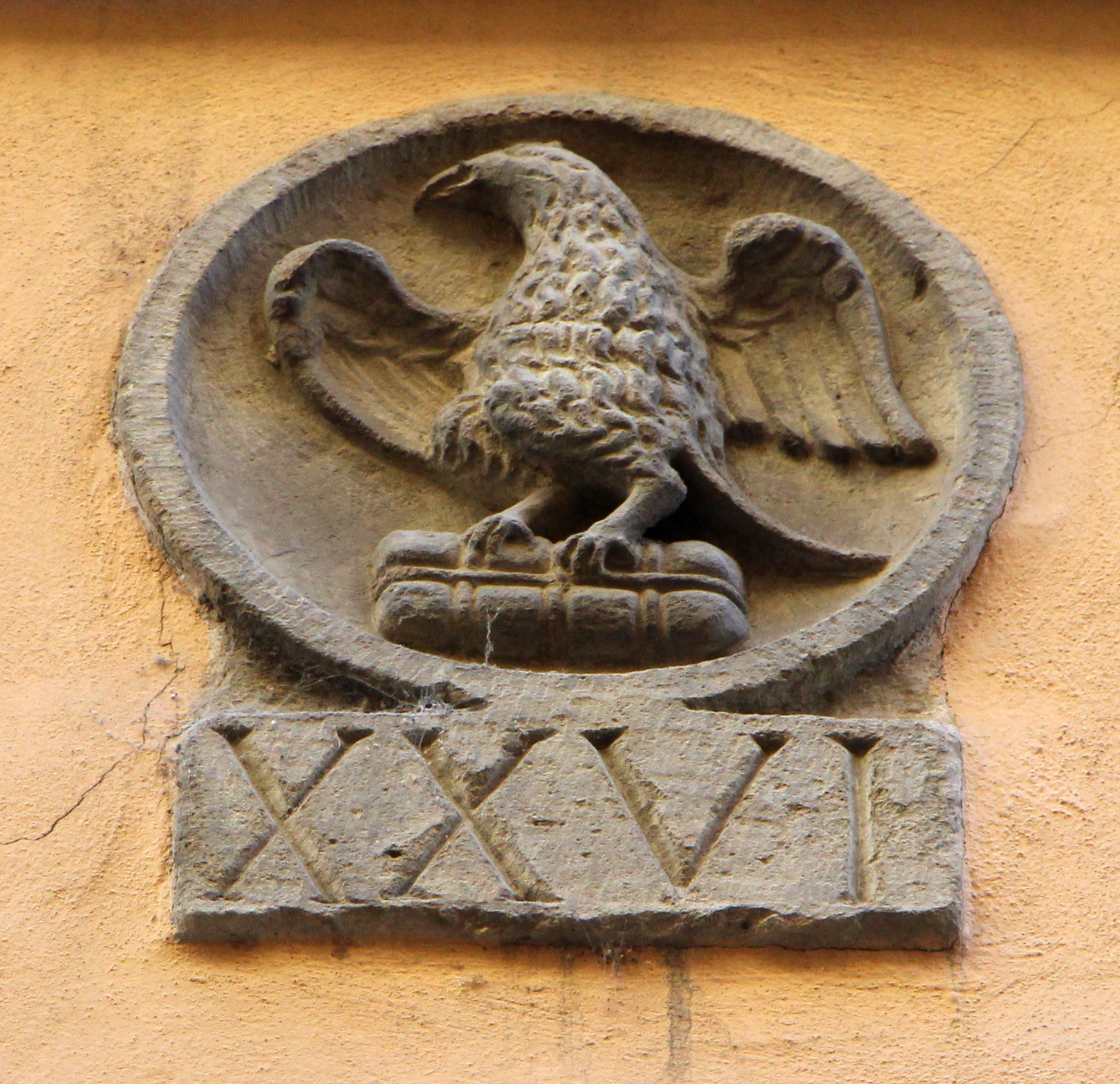
Stone marker with the coat of arms at the Palazzo di Arte di Calimala, the guild to which Giovanni Villani belonged

Villani and the Buonaccorsi had gained an unsavory reputation as early as 1331, when Villani was tried (and cleared) for barratry for his part in building the new third circuit of walls around Florence. Charles, Duke of Calabria had granted the Buonaccorsi the right to tax three of the six districts of Florence, which did not help Villani's reputation amongst his fellow citizens. In early June 1342, partners and agents of the Buonaccorsi suddenly fled Florence, Avignon, and Naples, following bankruptcy proceedings by creditors, nearly all of whom had deposits in the Buonaccorsi bank. Like other Florentine bankers and companies having difficulty with bankruptcy at the time, in September 1342 they supported the move to invite Walter VI of Brienne to become the next signor of Florence. Walter later suspended all legal actions taken against the Buonaccorsi and other company partners for nearly a year.

However, the legal case against the company was reopened and resumed in October 1343, after the violent overthrow of Walter VI. It is unclear how long Villani served his prison sentence for alleged misconduct during the economic disaster of 1346. It is known that he was imprisoned in the Carceri delle Stinche. After the overthrow of the Brienne regime and a subsequent but short-lived aristocratic signoria, the novi cives or new families—some even from the lesser guilds—rose up in late September 1343 and established a government that provided them with much greater representation in officialdom. Villani and other chroniclers disdained these rustic non-aristocrats who suddenly rose to power, considering them brazen upstarts incapable of governance. Villani's class was at a constitutional disadvantage, as twenty-one guilds representing twenty-one equal voices in government meant that the oligarchy of higher guildsmen was "helplessly outnumbered" as historian John M. Najemy states. Yet by the 1350s the general attitude towards the novi cives had changed much, as even Villani's brother Matteo depicted them in a heroic light for being united in a coalition with the merchants and artisans to curb oligarchic power. Villani was also a staunch supporter of what he deemed the liberties of the Church, while criticizing the new popular government of the novi cives since they protested against the many legal exemptions the Church enjoyed. However, he did find civic pride in that the whole city—including the novi cives—had joined together in an uprising against Walter VI, whose sins of imposing tyranny were, to Villani, sufficient justification for the violence needed to overthrow him.

== Nuova Cronica ==
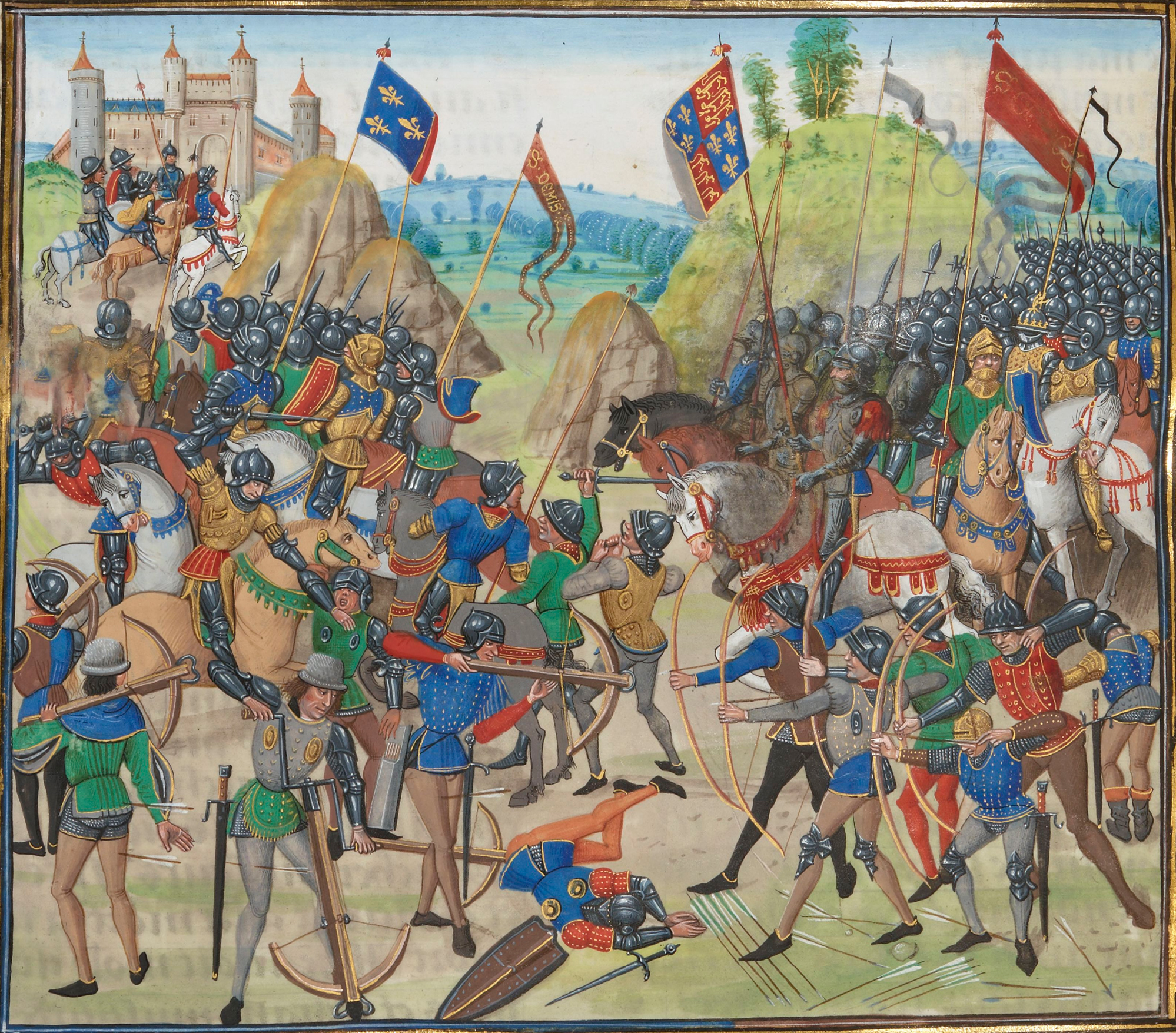
The Battle of Crécy in 1346, from Froissart's Chronicles; Giovanni Villani wrote an accurate description of the battle and other events.

Villani's work is an Italian chronicle written from the perspective of the political class of Florence just as the city rose to a rich and powerful position. Only scanty and partly legendary records had preceded his work, and there is little known of events before the death of Countess Matilda in 1115. The Chronica de origine civitatis was composed sometime before 1231, but there is little comparison between this work and Villani's; mid-20th-century historian Nicolai Rubinstein states that the legendary accounts in this earlier chronicle were "arbitrarily selected by a compiler whose learning and critical faculties were considerably below the standard of his age." In contrast, Rubinstein states Villani provided "a mature expression" of Florentine history. Yet Villani still relied upon the Chronica de origine civitatis as the prime source for Florence's early history in his narrative.

In the 36th chapter of Book 8, Villani states that the idea of writing the Cronica was suggested to him during the jubilee of Rome in 1300, under the following circumstances after Pope Boniface VIII made in honor of Christ's nativity a great indulgence; Villani writes:

And being on that blessed pilgrimage in the sacred city of Rome and seeing its great and ancient monuments and reading the great deeds of the Romans as described by Virgil, Sallust, Lucan, Livy, Valerius, Orosius, and other masters of history ... I took my prompting from them although I am a disciple unworthy of such an undertaking. But in view of the fact that our city of Florence, daughter and offspring of Rome, was mounting and pursuing great purposes, while Rome was in its decline, I thought it proper to trace in this chronicle the origins of the city of Florence, so far as I have been able to recover them, and to relate the city's further development at greater length, and at the same time to give a brief account of events throughout the world as long as it please God, in the hope of whose favor I undertook the said enterprise rather than in reliance on my own poor wits. And thus in the year 1300, on my return from Rome, I began to compile this book in the name of God and the blessed John the Baptist and in honor of our city of Florence.

In his writing, Villani states that he considers Florence to be the "daughter and creation of Rome," but asserts Rome's decline and Florence's rise as a great city compelled him to lay out a detailed history of the city. To emphasize the imperial greatness of Florentine history, Villani also asserted that the city was given a second founding when it was rebuilt by Charlemagne (r. 800–814 as Holy Roman Emperor)—which was absent from the Chronica de origine civitatis. Historian J. K. Hyde writes that the idea of Florence being the daughter of Rome would have given the Florentines a sense of destiny, while the second founding by Charlemagne provided historical context for alliance with France, which Hyde calls "the touchstone of Guelphism". Villani's reasoning for Rome's decline was the schisms of the Church and rebellion against the papal institution, while the ascension of Otto I, Holy Roman Emperor (r. 962–973) allowed for the conditions of Florence's rise against enemies of papal authority, such as Florentine-conquered Fiesole. Villani was certain that the Republic of Florence had experienced a great setback on its path to glory with the defeat of the Guelphs by the Ghibellines at the Battle of Montaperti in 1260. Despite this, Villani states that the paramount prosperity and tranquility of the city by 1293 was evidenced by the fact that its gates were no longer locked at night and that indirect taxes such as the gate fee (common in times of war) were not levied. Historian Felicity Ratté states that the validity of this comment should be heavily scrutinized considering the Florence statutes of 1290 that designated employment for individuals in charge of locking the city gates. Villani also contradicts himself by writing of a night attack on Florence in 1323 which clearly demonstrates the fact that the gates were locked at night.

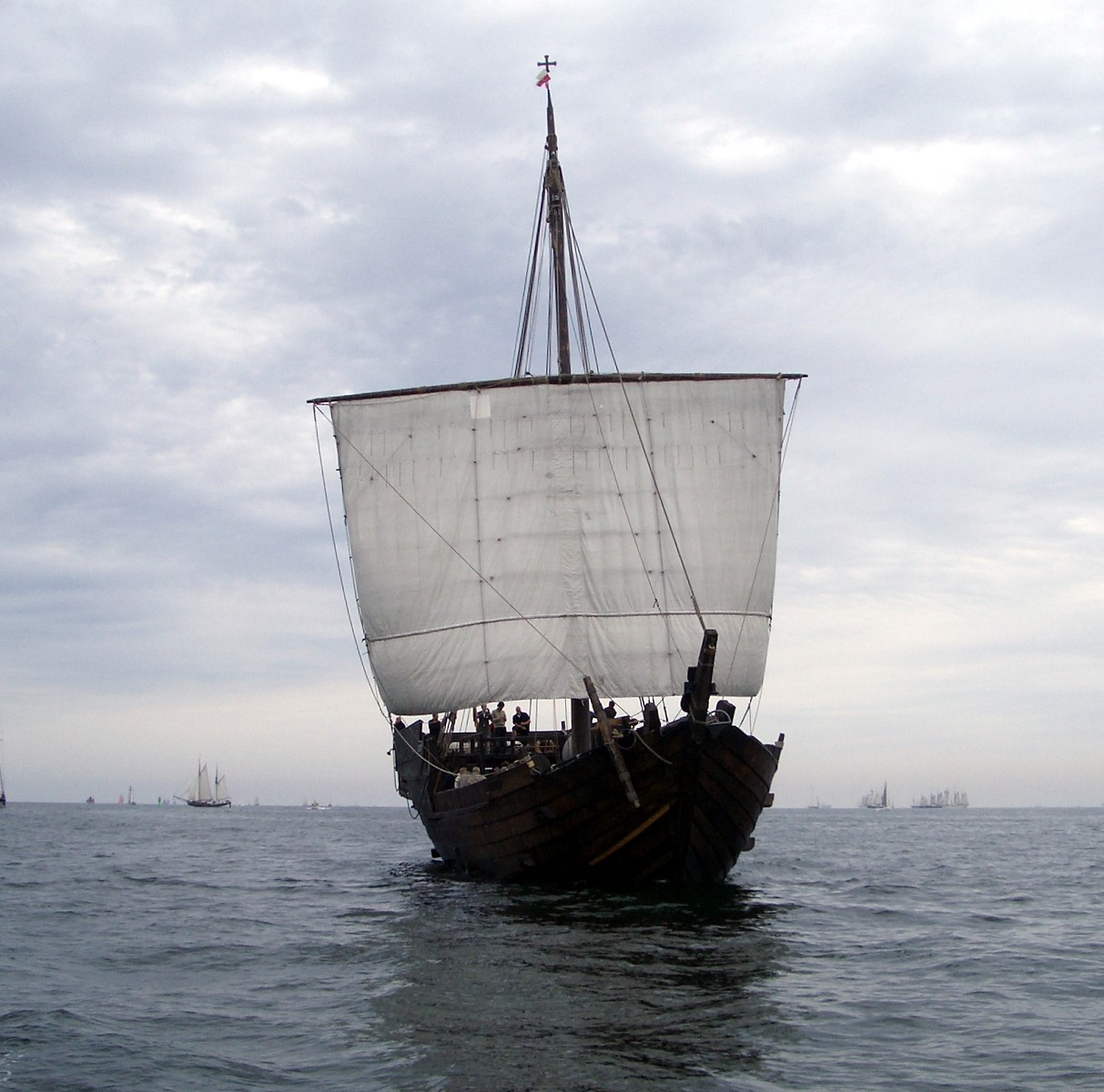
Villani wrote that the small cog type vessel with single mast, square sail, and stern-post rudder was introduced to the Genoese and Venetians in 1304 by pirates from Bayonne.

In 1300 or shortly after, Villani began working on the Cronica, which was divided into twelve books; the first six deal with the largely legendary history of Florence, starting at conventionally biblical times with the story of the Tower of Babel up to the year 1264. The second phase, in six books, covered the history from 1264 until his own time, all the way up to 1346. He outlined the events in his Cronica in year-to-year accounts; for this he has gained criticism over the years for writing in an episodic manner lacking a unifying theme or point of view. He wrote his Cronica in the vernacular language rather than Latin, the language of the educated elite. His chronicles are intercut with historical episodes reported just as he heard them, sometimes with little interpretation. This often led to historical inaccuracies in his work, especially in the biographies of historical or contemporary people living outside of Florence (even with well-known monarchs).

Despite numerous mistakes, Villani often displayed an insider's knowledge on many subjects, as a result of his extensive travels and access to both official and private documents. For example, De Vries states that he wrote one of the most accurate accounts of the Battle of Crécy during the Hundred Years' War, including information that the archers were placed precariously behind the English and Welsh infantry, not on the flanks as others asserted. While describing detailed events unfolding within the city, Villani would name every individual street, square, bridge, family, and person involved, assuming his readers would have the same intimate knowledge of Florence as he did.

Villani is perhaps unequalled for the value of the statistical data he has preserved. For example, he recorded that in Florence there were 80 banks, 146 bakeries, 80 members in an association of city judges with 600 notaries, 60 physicians and surgical doctors, 100 shops and dealers of spices, 8,000 to 10,000 children attending primary school each year, 550 to 600 students attending 4 different schools for Scholastic knowledge, 13,200 bushels of grain consumed weekly by the city, and 70,000 to 80,000 pieces of cloth produced in the workshops of the Arte della Lana each year, the latter having a total value of 1,200,000 gold florins.

Villani was a Guelph, but his book is much more taken up with an inquiry into what is useful and true than with factional party considerations. In a departure from Guelph politics, he favored republicanism over monarchy, praising the philosopher Brunetto Latini as "the master and initiator in refining the Florentines, in making them skilled in good speaking and in knowing how to guide and rule our republic according to political science." However, Villani admitted in his writing that republicanism bred factional strife, that benevolent rulers like Robert of Naples were sometimes needed to keep order, and republicanism could become tyrannical if it came to represent only one class (such as exclusive favoring of aristocrats, merchants, or artisans). When detailing the construction of the Florence Cathedral and the artist Giotto di Bondone as the designer of the new bell tower, Villani called him "the most sovereign master of painting in his time." Villani's Cronica also provides the first known biography of Dante Alighieri (1265–1321), author of the Divine Comedy, who Villani described as haughty, disdainful, and reserved. In his revised Cronica of 1322, Villani shortened Dante's biography and the amount of quotations taken from his Divine Comedy. Villani's actions are explained by Richard H. Lansing and Teodolinda Barolini, who write: "Evidently two decades after the poet's death a conservative writer closely identified with the Florentine state still felt obliged to distance himself from the most outspoken critic of the basis of that state's prestige."

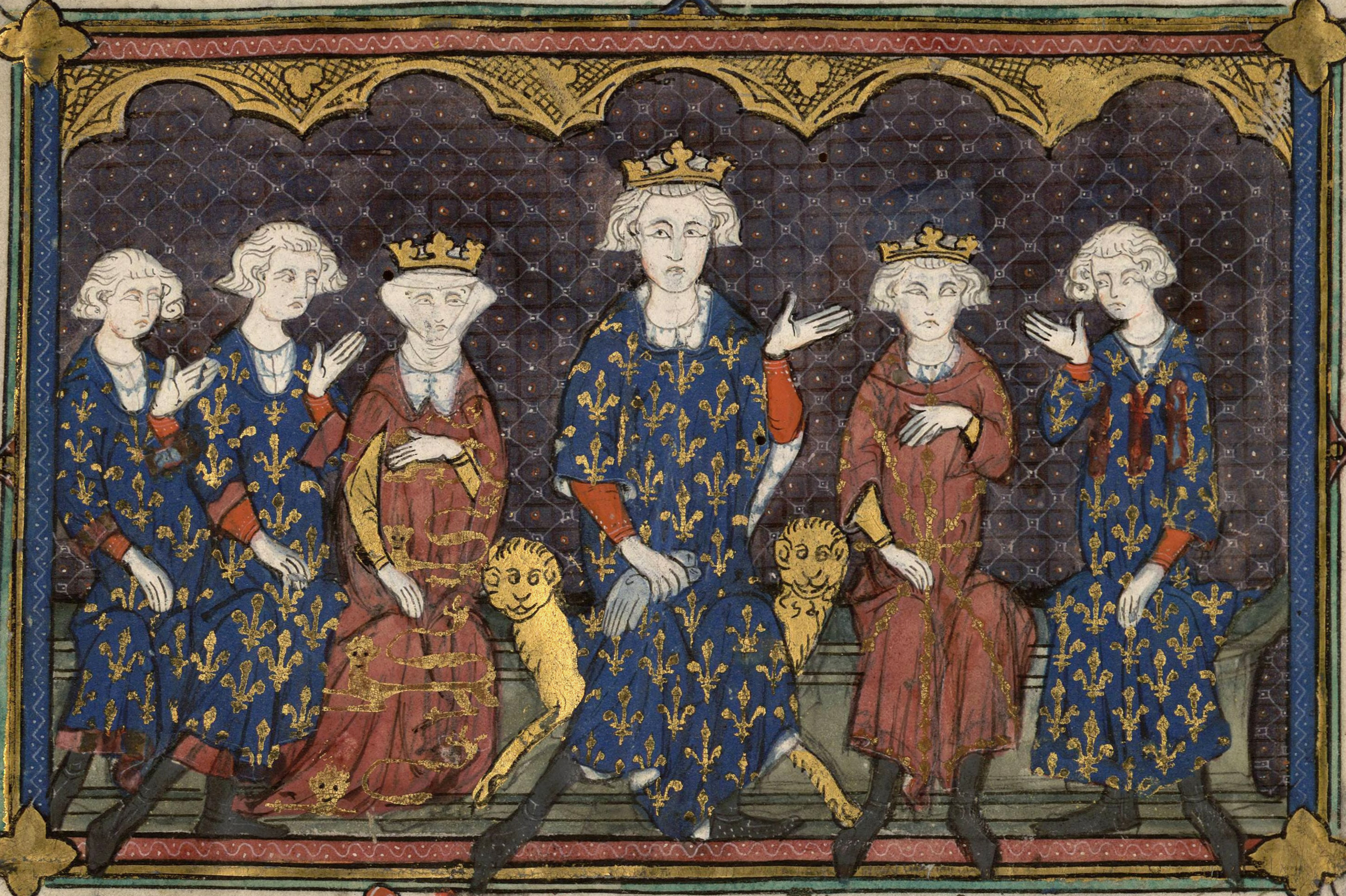
Villani states that Philip IV of France fell from power and grace due to sin and immorality rather than fortune or circumstance. He and his family in a manuscript dated 1313 Bibliothèque nationale de France (Ms Lat 8504 f.1v).

Historian Louis Green writes that the Cronica was written with three general assumptions about morality which shaped the organization of the work, "[channeling] events into recurring patterns of significance." These general assumptions were that excess brings disaster, that history is governed by a struggle between right and wrong, and that there is a direct connection between the events of the natural world and the overriding, supernatural and divine will of God who intercedes in these events. For example, Villani described the story of Count Ugolini of Pisa, who at the height of attaining his ill-gotten wealth and power was overthrown and eventually starved to death along with his sons. Green writes that this story in the Cronica bears a resemblance to the ancient Greek story of Polycrates and his ring in the work of Herodotus. However, Green notes that Villani's "cautionary tales" disembarked from the Classical Greek tradition of the arrogant and haughty rich falling from fortune due to the Greek belief in equalizing forces determining one's unavoidable fate, which Green calls "excessive good fortune having to be balanced by an appropriate measure of sorrow." Villani's adherence to Medieval Christianity allowed him to suggest retribution was delivered because of sin and insult to God. He stressed that those who gained prestige would fall prey to pride; confidence in their position would then lead them to sin, and sin would bring on a stage of decline. Villani wrote:

it seems that it happens in the lordships and states of earthly dignitaries, that as they are at their highest peak, so presently does their decline and ruin follow, and not without the providence of divine justice, in order to punish sins and so that no one should place his trust in fallacious good fortune.

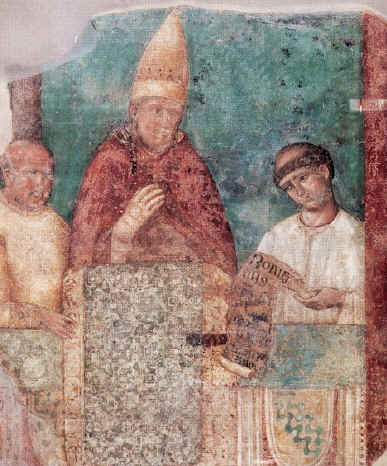
Pope Boniface VIII, by Giotto

For Villani, this theory of sin and morality being tied directly with fate and fortune fit well with the ultimate fate of the Capetian dynasty of France. The House of Capet was once the champion of the Church and ally of the papacy. However, Villani correlated Philip the Fair's defiance of Pope Boniface VIII and seizure of the Templar's wealth with later Capetian misfortunes, such as Philip's death in a hunting accident, the adultery of the wives of his three sons, the death of his heirs, and even French defeats in the early stages of the Hundred Years' War. Green points out that in Villani's writing there are two significant earthly powers that seem to be exempt or immune from this theory of immorality leading to downfall: Florence and the papacy. The interests of these two powers represent, as Green states, "the kingpin of Villani's scheme of historical interpretation."

Besides Divine Providence, Villani acknowledged other events that he believed were explainable via the supernatural. He wrote of many instances where holy men offered prophetic statements that later proved true, such as Pope Clement IV's prophecy on the outcome for the Battle of Tagliacozzo. He believed that certain events were really omens of what was to come. For instance, when a lion was sent to Florence as a gift by Boniface VIII, a donkey purportedly killed the lion. He interpreted this as an omen that foretold the Pope's beating and untimely death shortly after fighting Philip IV at Anagni; Villani wrote: "when the tamed beast kills the King of Beasts, then the dissolution of the Church will begin." He also believed in astrology and changes in the heavens as indication of political changes, the deaths of rulers and popes, and natural calamities. However, he noted that the movement of the heavens would not always predetermine the actions of men and did not trump the divine plan of God.

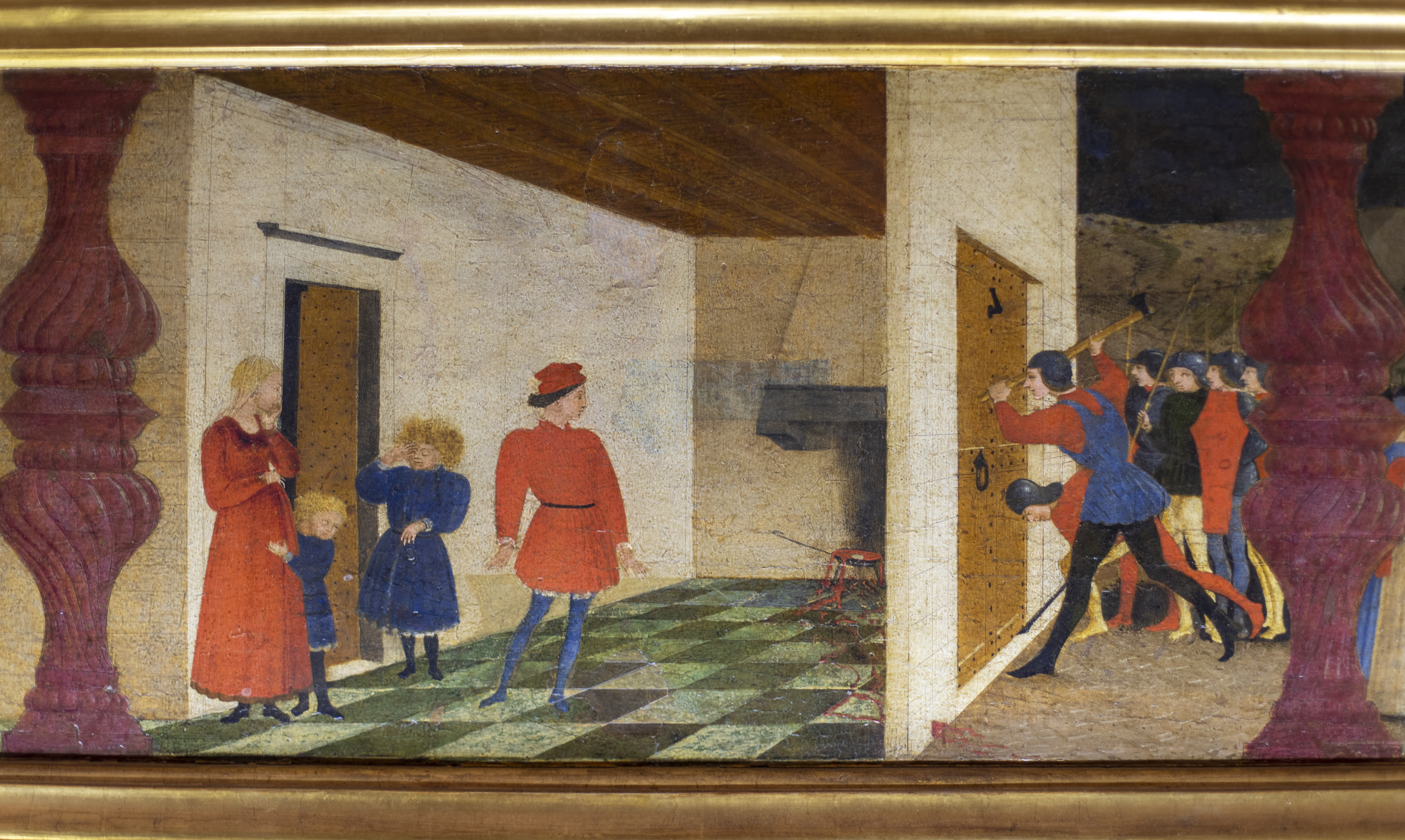
A scene in Paolo Uccello's Corpus Domini predella (c. 1465–1468), set in a Jewish pawnbroker's home. Blood in the background emanates from the Host, which the moneylender has attempted to stab, and seeps under the door.

Marilyn Aronberg Lavin states that Villani was most likely serving as a Peruzzi representative in Flanders when he heard the story of the French Jew who in 1290 tried to destroy Host bread (of the Eucharist) but was unsuccessful as the bread allegedly bled profusely as he stabbed it, and turned into flesh as he attempted to boil it in water. In the original account by the Ghent monk Jean de Thilrode in 1294, the Jew was compelled to convert to Christianity, but Villani's account followed that of the later Chronicles of Saint-Denis (1285–1328) which told that the Jew was burned to death for his crime. Villani's Cronica marks the first appearance in Italian literature of this legend, while "Villani's report includes details which establish an independent Italian branch of the tradition" according to Lavin. St. Antoninus, archbishop of Florence, repeated the story of Villani in his Latin Chronicles, while Villani's illustrated Cronica featured a scene of this French Jew that later appeared in a painting by Paolo Uccello.

== Death and continuation of Villani's work ==
Map showing the spread of bubonic plague in Europe, a process Villani described in detail, noting that the death toll from the Black Death in Florence was not as great as other cities and regions he listed, such as Turkey, Pistoia, Prato, Bologna, Romagna, France, etc.

Villani wrote during the bubonic plague: "The priest who confessed the sick and those who nursed them so generally caught the infection that the victims were aVol.oned and deprived confession, sacrament, medicine, and nursing ... And many lands and cities were made desolate. And this plague lasted till ________"; Villani left the blank in order to record the time in which the plague was to end. Villani was unable to finish the line as he succumbed to the same plague. He was buried in the Church of Santissima Annunziata, Florence. Villani's Cronica was considered an important work at the time, valuable enough for his brother and nephew to continue it. Little is known of Villani's brother, Matteo, save that he was twice married, that he died of the plague in 1363, and that he continued work on the Cronica until his death. Filippo Villani, Matteo's son, flourished in the latter half of the 14th century and ended the Cronica at 1364; his portion includes details of the lives of many Florentine artists and musicians, including Giotto di Bondone and Francesco Landini. Filippo's chronicles were approved by the Chancellor of Florence, Coluccio Salutati, who made corrections to the work and added commentary. The 15th-century Florentine historian Domenico di Leonardo Buoninsegni also featured in the first two chapters of his Istoria Fiorentina a summary of Villani's Cronica.

By the 16th century, more than one edition of the Cronica was available in printed form. There was also an abundance of handwritten illuminated manuscripts, including one from Venice by Bartholomeo Zanetti Casterzagense in 1537 and one from Florence by Lorenzo Torrentino in 1554.

== Legacy and criticism ==
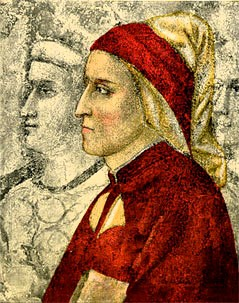
This painting of Dante Alighieri, painted by Giotto, is in the chapel of the Bargello palace in Florence. The Cronica has aided modern scholars in further studies of Villani's various contemporaries such as Dante.

Historian J.K. Hyde states that the Nuova Cronica of Villani is representative of the strong vernacular tradition in Florence, appealing to the people of the time as a narrative that was "easy to read, full of human interest and occasionally spiced with novella-type anecdotes." Hyde also notes that Villani's criticisms of the commune politics in Florence promoted a trend of personal expression amongst later chroniclers that defied official conformity. The Cronica is also an incredibly rich historical record; its greatest value to modern historians is its descriptions of the people, data, and events experienced by Villani during his lifetime. Historian Mark Phillips states that all subsequent Florentine accounts of the tyrannical regime of Walter VI of Brienne—including those by Leonardo Bruni and Niccolò Machiavelli—were based upon the primary source of Villani's Cronica. Villani's written work on Dante Alighieri and the age in which he lived has provided insight into Dante's work, reasoning, and psyche. The reprinting of new editions of Villani's work in the early 20th century provided material for a resurgence in the study of Dante. However, Villani's descriptions of events which preceded him by centuries are riddled with inaccurate traditional accounts, popular legend, and hearsay.

In regard to his own time, Villani provides modern historians with valuable details on Florentine social and living habits, such as the growing trend and craze of wealthy Florentines in building large country homes far outside of the city. However, the early 20th-century historian Philip Wicksteed stated of Villani, "When dealing with his own times, and with events immediately connected with Florence, he is a trustworthy witness, but minute accuracy is never his strong point; and in dealing with distant times and places he is hopelessly unreliable." For example, although Nicolai Rubinstein acknowledged that Villani's chronicles were much more matured and developed than earlier ones, Villani still relied on legend and hearsay to account for the origins of cities such as Fiesole. On Villani's estimation that a third of Antwerp's population died off during the Great Famine of 1315-1317, the early 20th-century historian Henry S. Lucas wrote, "not much faith can be placed in such statistics which are little better than guesses." Louis Green notes Villani's limitation as a chronicler and not a full-fledged historian:

Recording as he did incidents in the order of their occurrence without any of the historian's pretensions to a thematic organization of his material, he could not feed back the lessons of a changing present into a reinterpreted past. Nor did his devotion to the justification and glorification of Florence permit him to see in the altered fortunes of his city a repetition of the pattern of decline he had illustrated in the histories of the great dynasties of his age.

Louis Green asserts that Giovanni's Cronica expressed the outlook of the merchant community in Florence at the time, but also provided valuable indications of "how that outlook was modified in a direction away from characteristically medieval to embryonically modern attitudes." Green writes that Villani's Cronica was one of three types of chronicles found in the 14th century, the type which was largely a universal history. Other types would be chronicles of particular historic episodes such as Dino Compagni's account of the White Guelphs and Black Guelphs or the more domestic chronicle that focused on the fortunes and events of one family, as written by Donato Velluti or Giovanni Morelli.

== Editions ==
- Pietro Massai (ed.). Istorie fiorentine di Giovanni Villani, cittadino fiorentino, fino all'anno MCCCXLVIII. 8 Volumes. Societè tipografica de' classici italiani, Milan 1802–1803 (in Italian):
  - Vol. 1 (primo), 1802;
  - Vol. 2 (secondo);
  - Vol. 3 (terzo);
  - Vol. 4 (quattro);
  - Vol. 5 (quinto);
  - Vol. 6 (sesto), 1803;
  - Vol. 7 (settimo);
  - Vol. 8 (ottavo).
- Achille Mauri (ed.). Istorie fiorentine di Giovanni Villani. Nicolò Bettoni, Mailand 1834, Digitalisat (in Italian).
- Giovanni Porta (ed.). Giovanni Villani: Nuova Cronica. 3 Volumes. Fondazione Pietro Bembo/Guanda, Parma, 1991, it.Wikisource (in Italian). [Vol. I: books 1–8, Vol. II: books 9–11, Vol. III: books 12 and 13.]
- Philip H. Wicksteed (ed.). Villani's Chronicle. Selections from the First Nine Books of the Croniche Fiorentine of Giovanni Villani. Translated by Rose E. Selfe. Archibald Constable, London 1906, revised 2nd edition (in English). Online at Project Gutenberg (2010).

== See also ==
- Battle of Campaldino
- Category:Italian historians
