= Vilani =

Vilani may refer to

- Vilani Nabukeera, ugandan Musician
- Viļāni, Latvia
- Aliona Vilani, Russian dancer
- Zul Vilani, Indian actor
- Vilani (Traveller), fictional aliens in Traveller

== See also ==
- Villani
