= Matteo Villani =

Italian historian

Matteo Villani (1283–1363) was an Italian historian.

Born in Florence, Villani was the brother of the historian Giovanni. He worked for a company called Buonaccorsi, of which he was the representative in Naples. After the death of his brother, he continued his work writing eleven books of the Nuova Cronica. Critics praised his commitment to seek sources and to read up on the facts; of particular importance it was the part related to the plague of 1348, which emerges between the clichés of the genre, an existential reflection on life. He died in a plague epidemic, in 1363. His work was briefly continued by his son Filippo.
