= Filippo Villani =

Chronicler from Florence, Italy (fl. 1400)

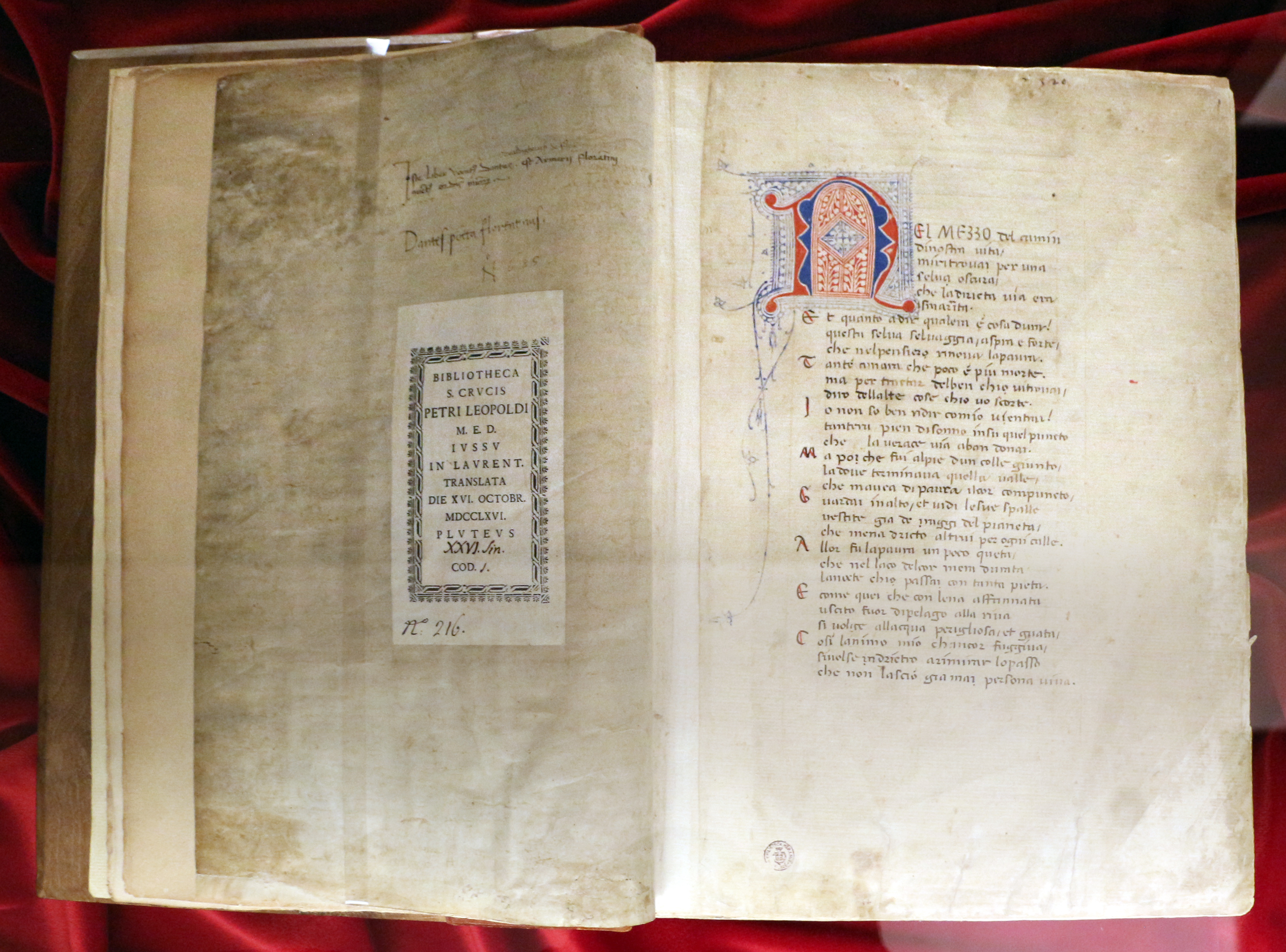
Dante's Comedy edited by Filippo Villani (1390-1405 ca.), Florence, Biblioteca Medicea Laurenziana

Filippo Villani (fl. end of the 14th and the beginning of the 15th century) was a chronicler of Florence. Son of the chronicler Matteo Villani, he extended the original Nuova Cronica of his uncle Giovanni Villani down to 1364.

== Career ==
Filippo Villani held a chair of jurisprudence in the Studio at Florence in 1361. He was also appointed chancellor of the medieval commune of Perugia in 1377, and would remain in office for the next six years. In his old age, he spent his time in Florence as public reader of the Divine Comedy by the Florentine Dante Alighieri. Accepting this job in 1392, he was given an annual stipend of 150 gold florins.

== Work ==
Villani's chronicles were approved by the Chancellor of Florence, Coluccio Salutati, who made corrections to the work and added commentary. The second edition of Villani's histories came out in either 1395 or 1396. Filippo Villani's portion includes details of the lives of many Florentine artists and musicians, including Giotto and Francesco Landini.
