= Kenneth R. Bartlett =

Canadian historian (born 1948)

- Born: 1948 (age 77–78)
- Education: University of Toronto
- Occupation: Historian

Kenneth R. Bartlett (born 1948) is a Renaissance historian, author, and professor at the University of Toronto, where he earned his Ph.D. degree in 1978. He was editor of Renaissance and Reformation/Renaissance et Réforme from 1985 until 1990 and President of the Canadian Society for Renaissance Studies from 1982 until 1984. Prof. Bartlett was the Founding Director of the University of Toronto Art Centre, and sat on the Board of the Gardiner Museum of Ceramic Art from 2001-2015. He was the Director of Faculty Programs in Arts and Science for 13 years, and in 2002 he was named the first Director of the Office of Teaching Advancement for the University of Toronto, a position he enjoyed until 2009.

Professor Bartlett currently teaches undergraduate and graduate courses at the university as Professor of History and Renaissance Studies (Victoria College) and is cross-appointed to the Department of Fine Art and the Centre for Medieval Studies.

As a consultant in faculty development, he has contributed to programs for the University of Dhofar, Sultanate of Oman, and Capital University of Business and Economics, Beijing. His consultancy in fine art includes work for public institutions and private collectors. In 2002 he was co-curator of the exhibition “Gods, Saints, and Heroes: Italian Renaissance Maiolica from the Metropolitan Museum,” at the George R. Gardiner Museum of Ceramic Art. He was a consultant for the exhibition “Raphael and His Circle: Drawings from Windsor Castle” for the Art Gallery of Ontario (AGO) in 2000. And two years earlier he was a contributor to the AGO audioguide for the exhibition, “Angels From the Vatican."

Outside of his academic work within the University of Toronto, Professor Bartlett leads cultural tours to Europe with his wife, Gillian, through their business, Bartlett Cultural Connections. He is in demand as a lecturer for such organizations as One Day University, Artful Dining, and ArtEmbassy. He has also appeared frequently on television for such programs as Museum Secrets, The Naked Archaeologist, and History Erased: A World Without Italy.

Professor Bartlett is best known internationally for his 5 video courses prepared for The Great Courses, the most popular of which his is his series of 36 half-hour lectures entitled "The Guide to Essential Italy," developed in conjunction with the Smithsonian. He was also the star of the first ever virtual reality travel tour—a half-hour visit to Venice produced as a joint collaboration by The Great Courses, The Smithsonian, and Oculus

== Awards ==
- Choice (American Library Association) Award for A Short History of the Italian Renaissance as Outstanding Academic Book: 2014
- Leadership in Faculty Teaching (LIFT): Provincial Government of Ontario 2007
- President's Teaching Award: University of Toronto 2006
- Arbor Award for outstanding volunteer service to the University of Toronto: 2005
- National 3M Teaching Fellowship: Society for Teaching and Learning in Higher Education (Canada) 2005
- Outstanding Teaching Award: Faculty of Arts and Science, University of Toronto 2003
- Teaching Excellence Award: Victoria University, University of Toronto 1993
- Students’ Administrative Council and Association of Part Time Students Excellence in Teaching Award: University of Toronto 2000 &2007
- Honoured for service to Renaissance Studies in Canada: Canadian Society for Renaissance Studies 1991
- Young Scholars' Competition Winner: Toronto Renaissance and Reformation Colloquium 1978
- S.H. Janes Silver Medal: Victoria College, University of Toronto 1971

== Written works ==
Professor Bartlett has published widely including more than a dozen books, contributions to more than 25 other books, and two dozen scholarly articles. His opinions on scholarly publications in the field of Renaissance Italy are widely solicited, witnessed by his publication of more than one hundred book reviews.

=== Books ===
- At Once a Home and a Paradise: The Letters of Katharine and Emily Roberts from Siena, 1895-96. Kenneth and Gillian Bartlett, eds. Siena, Italy: Extempora Edizioni, 2024. (474 pp.)
- The European Experience: 1350-1950. Kendall Hunt Publishing. 2021. (407 pp. Illustrated)
- The Renaissance in Italy: A History. (with Gillian Bartlett) Hackett Publishing, 2019. (412 pp. Illustrated)
- The Age of the Medici and Savonarola. Hackett, 2018. (192 pp.)
- The Experience of History. Wiley-Blackwell, 2017. (168 pp.)
- The Renaissance and Reformation in Northern Europe. (with M. McGlynn) University of Toronto Press, 2014. (288 pp.)
- A Short History of the Italian Renaissance. University of Toronto Press. 2013. (419 pp.)
- The Civilization of the Italian Renaissance. Revised, 2nd edition. University of Toronto Press. 2011. (xx + 314 pp.)
- Humanism and the Northern Renaissance. (with M. McGlynn) Canadian Scholars' Press, 2000. (436 pp.)
- Aeneas Silvius Piccolomini (Pius II). The Two Lovers: The Goodly Story of the Lady Lucrece and her Lover, Eurialus (De duobus amantibus). (Edited with notes and introductions by K.R. Bartlett and E. O'Brien.) Dovehouse Press, Barnabe Riche Society, 1999. (188 pp.)
- Giovanni Della Casa. Galateo. Translated with an introduction and notes by K.R. Bartlett and K. Eisenbichler. Renaissance Texts in Translation Series, Toronto, 1985 (2nd edition, Ottawa, 1990, 123pp.) 3rd edition, Toronto, 1994. (98 pp.)
- Angelo Beolco (Ruzzante), La Moschetta, trans. with and introduction and notes by K.R. Bartlett and A. Franceschetti. Carleton Renaissance Plays in Translation (Dovehouse), 1993. (123 pp.).
- The Civilization of the Italian Renaissance. D.C. Heath & Co., 1992. (464 pp.)
- The English in Italy 1525-1558: A Study in Culture and Politics. Bibliothèque du Voyage en Italie, Etudes, 39. Geneva: Slatkine, 1991. (viii + 253 pp.)
- Love and Death in the Renaissance. (with J. Liedl and K. Eisenbichler) Dovehouse Press, 1991. (x + 219 pp.)
