= Ordinances of Justice =

Laws in Florence in the 1200s

The Ordinances of Justice were a series of statutory laws enacted in the Republic of Florence of northern Italy between the years 1293 and 1295.

== Description ==
These laws were directed against, and identified by name, particularly influential (i.e. aristocratic) families and Ghibelline sympathizers. Those identified were supposed to possess a bellicose and ungovernable nature. Primarily these people were barred from holding office and, if they committed certain crimes their punishment could be doubled.

In later years the severity of the Ordinances of Justice were somewhat mitigated but they stayed in force. These ordinances ensured that the guilds of Florence retained control of the city.

The Ordinances of Justice established the government of Florence as being ruled by 12 Priors of the major Guilds. The election process was a lottery, in which eligible merchant's names would be added to a bag held by the Franciscan Priests. Every two months, the bag would have twelve names pulled out of it, and those merchants would be the new Priors.

This lottery system caused a need for a change to the education system, and ultimately led to the implementation of Humanities in major universities around Europe.

== See also ==
- 13th century in the Republic of Florence
