= Jacopo d'Angelo =

Italian classical scholar and Renaissance humanist (c. 1360–1411)

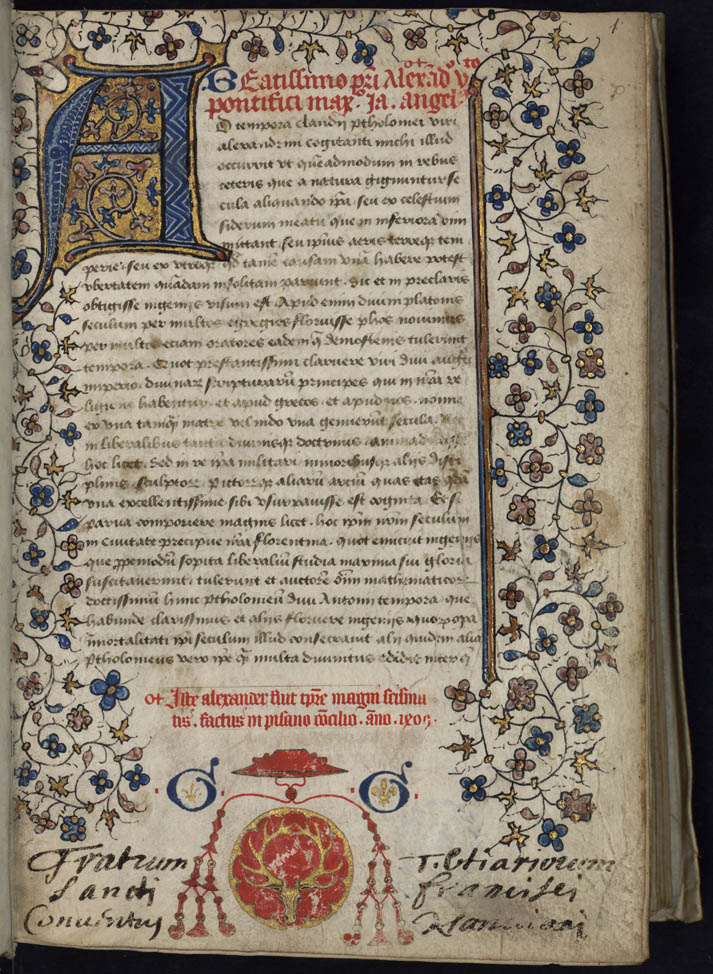
Jacopo d'Angelo's Latin translation of Ptolemy's Geography (c. 1411–1427); scan from the Nancy Library.

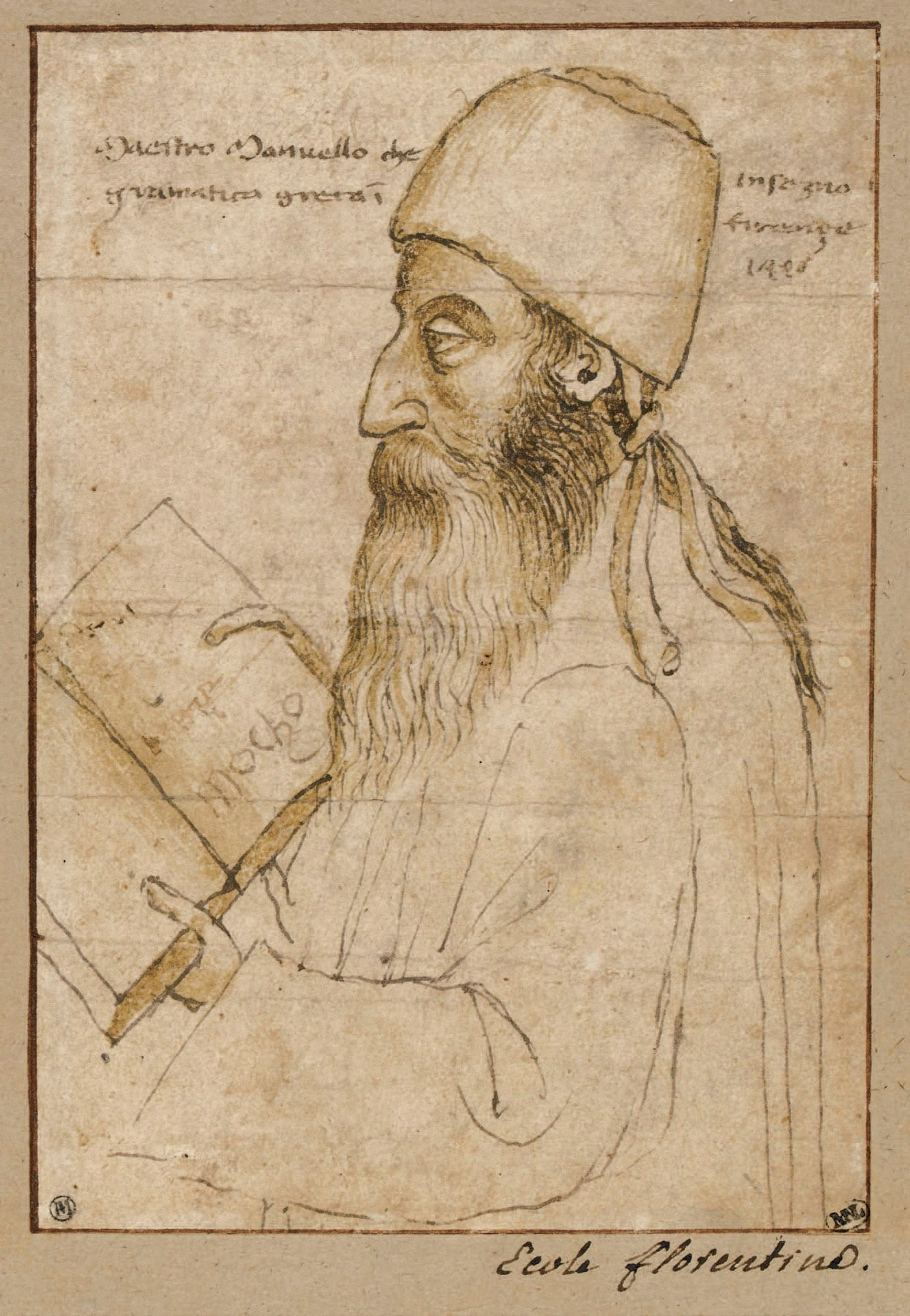
Manuel Chrysoloras, renowned professor of Greek in medieval Italy, portrayed by Paolo Uccello in 1408. Drawing currently preserved in the Louvre Museum, Paris.

Giacomo or Jacopo d'Angelo, also surnamed De Scarperia, (c. 1360–1411), better known by his Latin name Jacobus Angelus, was an Italian classical scholar, humanist, and translator of ancient Greek texts during the Renaissance. Named for the village of Scarperia in the Mugello in the Republic of Florence, he traveled to Venice where the Byzantine emperor Manuel II Palaiologos' ambassador Manuel Chrysoloras (c. 1350–1415) was teaching Greek, the first scholar to hold such course in medieval Italy.

Da Scarperia returned with Chrysoloras to Constantinople—the first Florentine to do so—along with Guarino da Verona. In the Byzantine Empire, he studied Greek literature and history under Demetrios Kydones. Coluccio Salutati wrote to urge Da Scarperia to search the libraries there, particularly for editions of Homer and Greek dictionaries, with the result that he translated Ptolemy's Geography into Latin in 1406. He first dedicated it to Pope Gregory XII and then to Pope Alexander V in 1409. He also brought new texts of Homer, Aristotle, and Plato to the attention of Western scholars of philosophy and ancient Greek literature.

== Early life and early education ==
Jacopo d'Angelo was born in the town of Scarperia, located in the Mugello region of Tuscany, which at the time was part of the Republic of Florence. Legal documents from this time show his full name to be "Iacobus Angeli Lippi Sostegni". Sostegni, therefore, was his surname but he went by Angeli. His exact date of birth is not known, but scholars place it around 1360. This date of birth is based on an observation made by d' Angelo's contemporary, Leonardo Bruni. Bruni, who was born in 1369, notes in his Commentarius that d’Angelo was much older than him. Scarperia was a Florentine fortress in the Mugello, a region in northeastern Tuscany. It was a stronghold that protected against the feudal might of the Ubaldini, a powerful family that dominated the area during this time.

There is not much known about d’Angelo's earliest years; this also applies to his family. What is known is that he was quite young when his father, Angelo, died. After his father's death, his mother soon remarried. She relocated to Florence with her new husband and took young d’Angelo with her. It was in Florence where d’Angelo would start his education. There, he would meet two people who would be very influential in his life. The first was Coluccio Salutati, who took an interest in d'Angelo and became his mentor. It was through Salutati's that d'Angelo began his study of the humanities. Also, it is very likely that Salutati advised d'Angelo to start school under the tutelage of Giovanni Malpaghini, a teacher at the Florentine Studio (University).

== Coluccio Salutati and Giovanni Malpaghini ==
Coluccio Salutati was a prominent humanist and Chancellor of Florence for many years. Becoming chancellor in 1375 and holding it for thirty-one years. He was a notary who studied law and rhetoric in Bologna. Much of his early life was spent in humble political offices where he read his favourite classics and composed Latin poetry. His work also concerned the subjects of philosophy and politics. Salutati also played a part in supplanting Aristotelianism and emphasizing the study of Plato when it came to philosophy. He influenced this transition in two ways. Firstly, he collected many works of Plato and secondly, by encouraging his pupils, like Leonardo Bruni, to make new translations of these works. Salutati's admiration for ancient literature led him to read classical authors first-hand and incentivized him to search for unknown works. His searches also led him to find those written in Greek, although he did not have much skill in it. Regarding his relationship with d'Angelo, it was very close. D'Angelo even stood to be godfather for one of Salutati's children. D'Angelo's study of Greek throughout his life was clearly influenced by Salutati's interest in this subject. Also, a picture of what d'Angelo's early education was like can be deduced from what Salutati studied.

Giovanni Malpaghini was another of d’Angelo's early teachers. He taught at the Florentine studio. Many of his students, like Vergerio and Strozzi, became important figures in the history of Italian humanism. His early life also included working for Petrarch as his principal secretary. Both he and Salutati worked under Francesco Bruni, where a close relationship formed. It is known that Malpaghini taught rhetoric from 1394 to 1400. However, it is uncertain if he taught before that time. Some scholars believe that Malphaghini's influence and reputation are understated. This is for two reasons, one because he never wrote any great work, and he is often confused with another Giovanni, Giovanni da Ravenna. They believe that the stylistic tendency to imitate Cicero, the major distinctive element of 14th-century humanism, was inspired by him. If so, crediting him with the new humanism of the 15th century would make him a major figure in the movement. Although not achieving the stature of some of Malpaghini's students, d’Angelo no doubt was influenced by his teacher's lessons in rhetoric and stylistic techniques.

== Early Greek studies in Europe ==
Although d’Angelo was one of the first humanists to study Greek and to attempt to translate Greek texts, it was not done in a vacuum. There are many myths about the study of Greek during the period. First was that after the fall of Rome no one was able to access knowledge of Greek, and the other was that Greek came to Western Europe after the fall of Constantinople. The fresh perspective that humanist brought to the study of Greek was the desire to read these texts for their own sake. Early Greek studies in the Middle Ages can be traced to the court of Charlemagne during the 8th century. At the Papal Curia, there were Greek manuscripts and men able to read them, as well as large parts of Sicily and Southern Europe that were Greek-speaking. Graeco-Sicilian scholars were responsible for translating many ancient Greek authors. The Council of Vienne in 1312 also commissioned teaching of Greek in the church, among other languages. Even places as far west as England had a history of Greek studies. Oxford established an official position for teaching Greek around the year 1320, although Greek studies can be traced even further back to Robert Grosseteste, a bishop of Lincoln in the early 13th century. He was responsible for translating some of the works of Aristotle. This shows that d’Angelo and other Greek humanists of his time were not embarking on something new, but rather building on a tradition that stretches back throughout the Middle Ages—albeit a tradition carried out intermittently, slightly suppressed in the 11th century, only to be revived in the 12th century.

== Later education and career ==
Jacopo studied under John Malpaghini, who was one of Petrarch's previous students and a well-known scholar in rhetoric, in Ravenna in 1394, where he would study ancient literature. Humanism was starting to become popular in the region of Florence, Italy. When Jacopo learned of the arrival of Manuel Chrysoloras, a Constantinople-born Greek scholar in 1395, they met through an acquaintance by the name of Roberto de Rossi to learn Chrysoloras’ teachings on ancient Greek texts. De Rossi was also a student of Chrysoloras and Coluccio Salutati, who was a key figure in Florentine humanism. Salutati would later become the Chancellor of Florence with important diplomatic ties to the Catholic Church. Chrysoloras was originally sent to Italy by Emperor Manuel II Palaeologus in order to seek help from Christian nobles against the advancing Muslim Turks. In Florence, Jacopo, as well as other Italian scholars, would establish the Florentine School of Chrysoloras. At this school Chrysoloras would become one of the first people to teach Greek to Italians. Many scholars would flock to this school, including Leonardo Bruni, an Italian scholar who would later become a famous humanist and Jacopo's rival.

After a meeting between Jacopo and Chrysoloras, they decided to return to Constantinople in 1395. At the time of his arrival, the city was under siege by the Muslim Turks. There, Jacopo learned Greek and studied Ancient Greek texts. While in Constantinople, Jacopo met a scholar by the name of Manuel Calecas, who was a well-known theologian and "admirer of the patristic tradition and school of the Latin West." Coluccio wrote to Jacopo about learning Greek, stating that it was important to know "the vocabulary and the grammar and provide, rather, in memorizing the largest possible number of words and idioms, paying attention to their uses and meanings." Since the city and empire were collapsing, many Byzantine scholars fled Constantinople to Europe, bringing with them different manuscripts from all periods of time.

After their return, Chrysoloras would gain a full-time position at the school that he had established and taught between the years of 1397 and 1400. In 1400, Jacopo travelled to Rome, where he continued to translate Greek texts into Latin. He would also begin to translate the Greek manuscripts that were brought back from Constantinople.

== Later life ==
After d’Angelo returned from Constantinople in 1396, he began translating Classical Greek works into Latin with the archbishop of Milan and Manuel Crysoloras. He also wanted to be a part of the papal court. In late 1400, he had already left for Rome because he hoped to obtain employment in the court of Pope Boniface IX. He spent the remainder of his life in the Roman Curia. While in Rome, he began to work towards becoming part of the patronage of a cardinal, beginning in 1401. Due to his connections and friends already being cardinals, on 25 July 1401, d’Angelo became the papal scribe for the court.

In 1405, the papal scribe for Pope Innocent VII became vacant once again, and d’Angelo wanted this position. However, Leonardo Bruni came to Rome and wanted the position as well. Pope Innocent VII set up a competition to see who was the worthy candidate. d’Angelo thought that due to his age and life experience, he would win against the much younger and less experienced Bruni. The test was each of the candidates needed to write a letter that devised a solution to solve the Great Schism. During the time of the Great Schism, the papacy was in Italy and France with two popes, one in each city. The letter's focus was on a solution as to why France was leaving the obedience. The letter would then be sent as a response to the Duke of Berry's letter that had been sent to Pope Innocent VII. Since d’Angelo's Latin was not as polished as Bruni's, Bruni was the successful candidate and became the papal scribe, much to the dismay of d’Angelo.

Tragedy struck when one of d’Angelo's mentors Salutati died in 1406. d’Angelo wrote Salutati's epitaph for him, which mainly celebrated his scholarly achievements. That same year, Pope Innocent VII died and Gregory XII was elected. d’Angelo was at both of these events and wrote important letters about them that were addressed to Manuel Chrysoloras.

Finally, in 1410, d’Angelo achieved the position of papal scribe under John XXIII, the position that he had wanted five years before. With this new position, d'Angelo was responsible for recording important teachings and the diplomatic affairs during the Great Schism. However, this desired position did not last very long. On 28 March 1411, a document claimed that d’Angelo had died in Rome. The cause of his death or the actual date is unknown.

== Translated works ==
Jacopo D’Angelo's translations of famous texts into Greek and Latin make him a semi-important figure during this period. He translated many of Plutarch's works—for example, the Vita Bruti, Vita Ciceronis, Vita Marii, Vita Pompeii, De Alexandri fortuna et virtute and De Romanorum fortuna aut virtute.

His most famous translation, from its original Greek into Latin, is the Geography of Ptolemy, which is criticized for being inaccurately translated by D’Angelo as well as being largely invalid as a critical text due to its numerous scientific inaccuracies, as well as being subject to Ptolemy's exotification of global geography. D’Angelo's translation allowed Ptolemy's work to become a best-seller and although the information in hindsight was in parts inaccurate, its popularity mitigates the historical importance of D’Angelo's translations on society during the Renaissance movement. D’Angelo as well as his teachers were considered influential in the world of geography due to the translations of Ptolemy's work. This text became a key feature of the period and was a popular read among various circles. However, D’Angelo received derision and a lack of respect from many of his contemporaries because of his inaccurate translations.
