= Poggio Bracciolini =

Italian scholar, writer and humanist (1380–1459)

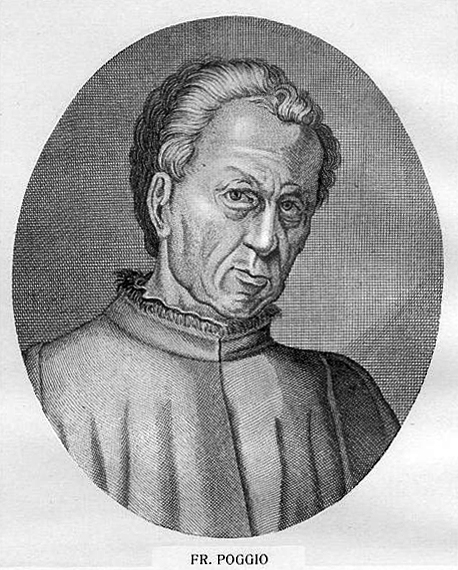
- Engraving of Bracciolini
- Born: Gian Francesco Poggio Bracciolini; 11 February 1380; Terranuova, Republic of Florence
- Died: 30 October 1459 (aged 79); Florence, Republic of Florence
- Occupation: Papal Secretary
- Children: 5 sons and a daughter

Gian Francesco Poggio Bracciolini (Italian: [dʒaɱ franˈtʃesko ˈpɔddʒo brattʃoˈliːni]; 11 February 1380 – 30 October 1459), usually referred to simply as Poggio Bracciolini, was an Italian scholar and an early Renaissance humanist. He is noted for rediscovering and recovering many classical Latin manuscripts, mostly decaying and forgotten in German, Swiss, and French monastic libraries. His most celebrated finds are De rerum natura, the only surviving work by Lucretius, De architectura by Vitruvius, lost orations by Cicero such as Pro Sexto Roscio, Quintilian's Institutio Oratoria, Statius' Silvae, Ammianus Marcellinus' Res Gestae (Rerum gestarum Libri XXXI), and Silius Italicus's Punica, as well as works by several minor authors such as Frontinus' De aquaeductu, Nonius Marcellus, Probus, Flavius Caper, and Eutyches.

== Birth and education ==
Poggio di Guccio (the surname Bracciolini added during his career) was born near Arezzo, in Tuscany, in the village of Terranuova, which in 1862 was renamed Terranuova Bracciolini in his honor.

Taken by his father to Florence to pursue the studies for which he appeared so apt, he studied Latin under the amanuensis Giovanni Malpaghino of Ravenna, the friend and protégé of Petrarch. His distinguished abilities and his dexterity as a copyist of manuscripts brought him into early notice of the chief scholars of Florence; both Coluccio Salutati and Niccolò de' Niccoli befriended him. He studied notarial law, and, at the age of twenty-one he was received into the Florentine notaries' guild, the Arte dei giudici e notai.

== Career and later life ==
In October 1403, on high recommendations from Salutati and Leonardo Bruni ("Leonardo Aretino"), he entered the service of Cardinal Landolfo Maramaldo, Bishop of Bari, as his secretary, and a few months later he was invited to join the Chancery of Apostolic Briefs in the Roman Curia of Pope Boniface IX. Over 11 years, he served under four successive popes (1404–1415), first as scriptor (writer of official documents), soon moving up to abbreviator, then scriptor penitentiarius, and scriptor apostolicus. Under Martin V he reached the top rank of his office, as Apostolicus Secretarius, papal secretary. As such he functioned as a personal attendant (amanuensis) of the Pope, writing letters at his behest and taking dictation, with no formal registration of the briefs, but instead preserving copies. He was noted for his impressive knowledge of Latin, his book hand (which was widely regarded by contemporaries as extraordinarily elegant), and for being an occasional liaison with Florence, which involved him in legal and diplomatic work.

Throughout his 50 year career, Poggio served a total of seven popes: Boniface IX (1389–1404), Innocent VII (1404–1406), Gregory XII (1406–1415), Antipope John XXIII (1410–1415), Martin V (1417–1431), Eugenius IV (1431–1447), and Nicholas V (1447−1455). While he held his office in the Curia through that period, which saw the Councils of Constance (1414–1418), in the train of Pope John XXIII, and of Basel (1431–1449), and the final restoration of the papacy under Nicholas V (1447), he was never drawn to ecclesiastical life, even with its potential riches. In spite of his meager salary in the Curia, he remained a layman to the end of his life.

The greater part of Poggio's life was spent in attendance to his duties in the Roman Curia at Rome and the other cities the pope was constrained to move his court. Although he spent most of his adult life in his papal service, he considered himself a Florentine working for the papacy. He actively kept his links to Florence and remained in constant communication with his influential Florentine friends: Coluccio Salutati (1331–1406), Niccolò de' Niccoli (1364–1437), Lorenzo de' Medici the elder (1395–1440), Leonardo Bruni (Chancellor, 1369–1444), Carlo Marsuppini ("Carlo Aretino", Chancellor, 1399–1453), and Cosimo de' Medici (1389–1464).

=== In England ===
After Martin V was elected as the new pope in November 1417, Poggio, although not holding any office, accompanied his court to Mantua in late 1418, but, once there, decided to accept the invitation of Henry, Cardinal Beaufort, bishop of Winchester, to go to England. His five years spent in England, until returning to Rome in 1423, were the least productive of his career.

=== In Florence ===
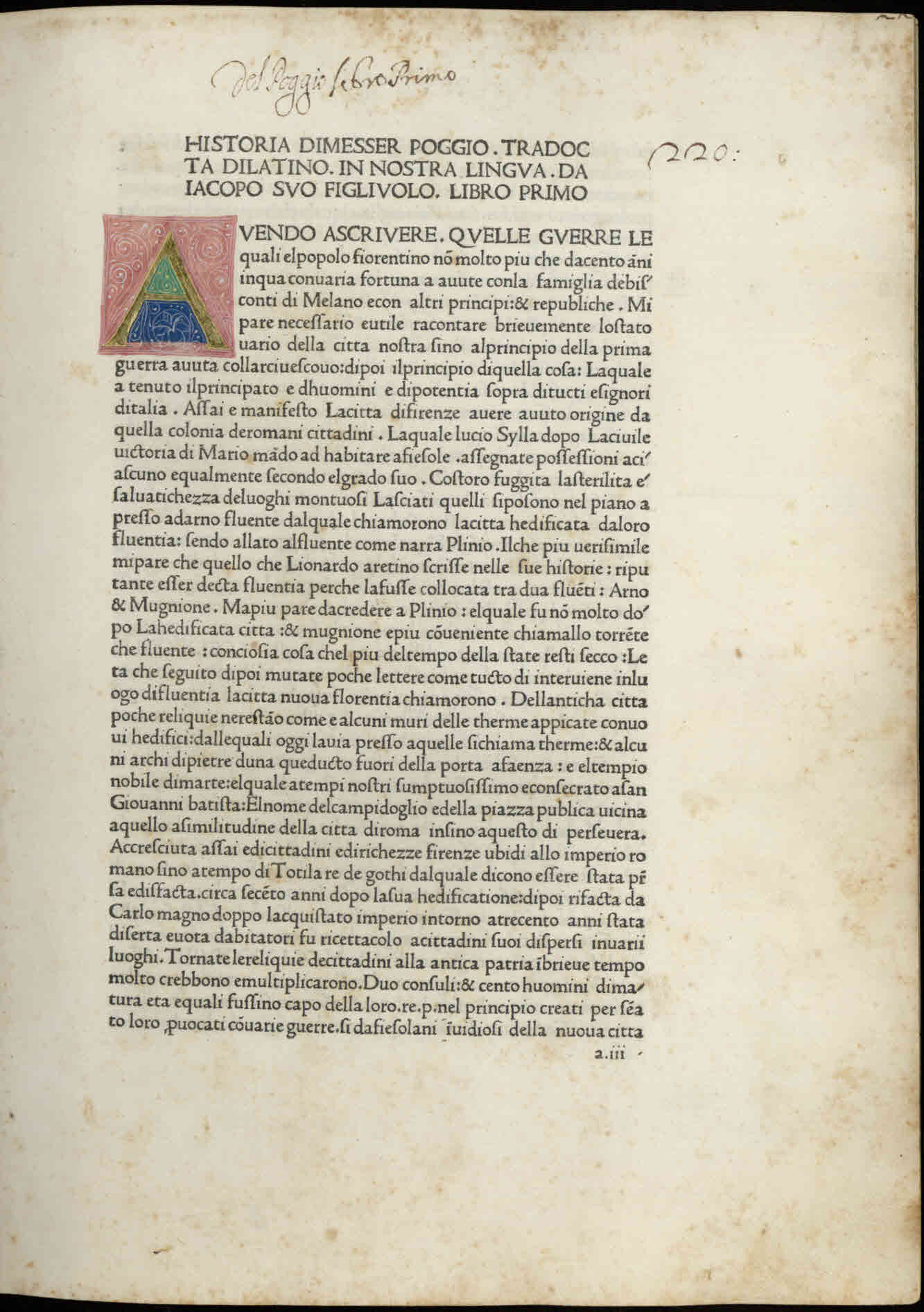
Historia Florentina, 1478

Poggio resided in Florence during 1434−36 with Eugene IV. On the proceeds of a sale of a manuscript of Livy in 1434, he built a villa in the Valdarno, which he adorned with a collection of antique sculpture (notably a series of busts meant to represent thinkers and writers of antiquity), coins and inscriptions.

In December 1435, at age 56, Poggio left his long-term mistress and delegitimized the fourteen children he had had with her, marrying the teenage daughter of a noble Florentine family, Selvaggia dei Buondelmonti. In spite of the large age gap (Selvaggia was not yet 18), the marriage was a happy one, producing five sons and a daughter. Poggio wrote a spate of long letters to justify his move, and composed one of his famous dialogues, An seni sit uxor ducenda (Whether an old man should marry, 1436).

Poggio also lived in Florence during the Council of Florence, from 1439 to 1442.

=== Relationship with Valla ===
In February 1452, Poggio published a detailed critique of Lorenzo Valla and the Elegantiae, Valla's major work on Latin language and style, wherein he supported a critical use of Latin eruditio going beyond pure admiration and imitatio of the classics. In the Elegantiae, Valla argued that the divinae litterae (biblical exegesis of the Judeo-Christian "sacred scriptures") could be subjected to the same philological criticism as the humanae litterae (profane classical Greek and Latin literature). Poggio held that humanism and theology were separate fields of inquiry, and labeled Valla's mordacitas (radical criticism) as dementia. Poggio's series of five Orationes in Laurentium Vallam (re-labeled Invectivae by Valla) were countered, line by line, by Valla's Antidota in Pogium (1452−53).

In 1505, the Dutch humanist Erasmus discovered Lorenzo Valla's Adnotationes in Novum Testamentum (New Testament Notes), which encouraged him to pursue the textual criticism of the Holy Scriptures, contributing to Erasmus's reputation as the leading Dutch Renaissance humanist. In his introduction, Erasmus declared his support of Valla's thesis against the invidia of envious scholars such as Poggio, whom he unfairly described as "a petty clerk so uneducated that even if he were not indecent he would still not be worth reading, and so indecent that he would deserve to be rejected by good men however learned he was."

Despite their public feud, Valla and Poggio later reconciled and became good friends at their prompting of the Italian humanist Filelfo, their mutual friend.

=== Later years and death ===
After the death in April 1453 of his close friend Carlo Aretino, who had been the Chancellor of the Florentine Republic, Poggio was chosen as his replacement by Cosimo de' Medici, then the ruler of Florence. He retired from his 50 years of papal service, and returned to Florence to assume his new role. This coincided with the news of the fall of Constantinople to the Ottomans.

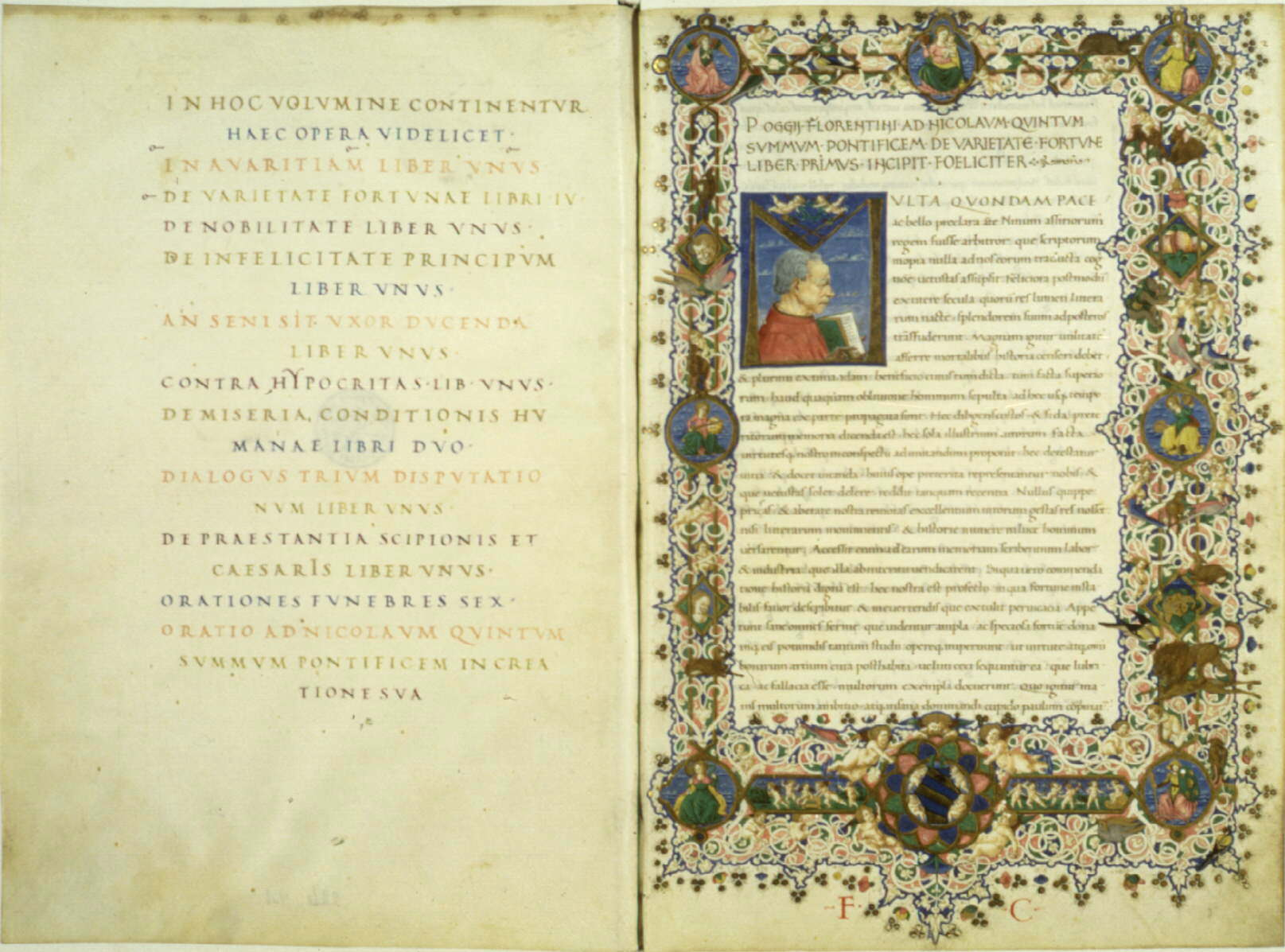
Urb. lat. 224, 15th century

Poggio's last months were spent in the discharge of his prestigious Florentine office, conducting both private and public affairs, editing his correspondence for publication, and composing his history of Florence; died in 1459 before he finished the work.

He was buried in the church of Santa Croce. A statue by Donatello and a portrait by Antonio del Pollaiuolo were placed at the site. During his life, Poggio acquired properties around Florence and invested in the city enterprises with the Medici bank. At his death, his gross assets amounted to 8,500 florins, with only 137 families in Florence owning more capital. His wife, five sons and daughter all survived him.

== Search for manuscripts ==
After July 1415—Antipope John XXIII had been deposed by the Council of Constance and the Roman Pope Gregory XII had abdicated—the papal office remained vacant for two years, which gave Poggio some leisure time in 1416/17 for his pursuit of manuscript hunting. In the spring of 1416 (sometime between March and May), Poggio visited the baths at the German spa of Baden. In a long letter to Niccoli (p. 59−68) he reported his discovery of an "Epicurean" lifestyle—one year before finding Lucretius—where men and women bathe together, barely separated, in minimum clothing: "I have related enough to give you an idea what a numerous school of Epicureans is established in Baden. I think this must be the place where the first man was created, which the Hebrews call the garden of pleasure. If pleasure can make a man happy, this place is certainly possessed of every requisite for the promotion of felicity." (p. 66)

Poggio was marked by the passion of his teachers for books and writing, inspired by the first generation of Italian humanists centered around Francesco Petrarch (1304–1374), who had revived interest in the forgotten masterpieces of Livy and Cicero, Giovanni Boccaccio (1313–1375) and Coluccio Salutati (1331–1406). Poggio joined the second generation of civic humanists forming around Salutati. Resolute in glorifying studia humanitatis (the study of "humanities", a phrase popularized by Leonardo Bruni), learning (studium), literacy (eloquentia), and erudition (eruditio) as the chief concern of man, Poggio ridiculed the folly of popes and princes, who spent their time in wars and ecclesiastical disputes instead of reviving the lost learning of antiquity.

The literary passions of the learned Italians in the new Humanist Movement, which were to influence the future course of both Renaissance and Reformation, were epitomized in the activities and pursuits of this self-made man, who rose from the lowly position of scribe in the Roman Curia to the privileged role of apostolic secretary.

He became devoted to the revival of classical studies amid conflicts of popes and antipopes, cardinals and councils, in all of which he played an official part as first-row witness, chronicler and (often unsolicited) critic and adviser.

Thus, when his duties called him to the Council of Constance in 1414, he employed his forced leisure in exploring the libraries of Swiss and Swabian abbeys. His great manuscript finds date to this period, 1415−1417. The treasures he brought to light at Reichenau, Weingarten, and above all St. Gall, retrieved from the dust and abandon many lost masterpieces of Latin literature, and supplied scholars and students with the texts of authors whose works had hitherto been accessible only in fragmented or mutilated copies.

=== St. Gallen ===
In his epistles he described how he recovered Cicero's Pro Sexto Roscio, Quintilian, Statius' Silvae, part of Gaius Valerius Flaccus, and the commentaries of Asconius Pedianus at St. Gallen. He also recovered Silius Italicus's Punica, Marcus Manilius's Astronomica, and Vitruvius's De architectura. The manuscripts were then copied, and communicated to the learned. He carried on the same untiring research in many Western European countries.

=== Cluny Abbey ===
In 1415 at Cluny he found Cicero's complete great forensic orations, previously only partially available.

=== Langres ===
At Langres in the summer of 1417 he discovered Cicero's Oration for Caecina and nine other hitherto unknown orations of Cicero's.

=== Monte Cassino ===
At Monte Cassino, in 1429, a manuscript of Frontinus' late first century De aquaeductu on the ancient aqueducts of Rome. He was also credited with having recovered Ammianus Marcellinus' Res Gestae (Rerum gestarum Libri XXXI), Nonius Marcellus, Probus, Flavius Caper and Eutyches.

=== Hersfeld Abbey ===
If a codex could not be obtained by fair means, he was not above using subterfuge, as when he bribed a monk to abstract a Livy and an Ammianus from the library of Hersfeld Abbey.

=== De rerum natura ===
Poggio's most famous find was the discovery of the only surviving manuscript of Lucretius's De rerum natura ("On the Nature of Things") known at the time, in a German monastery (never named by Poggio, but probably Fulda), in January 1417. Poggio spotted the name, which he remembered as quoted by Cicero. This was a Latin poem of 7,400 lines, divided into six books, giving a full description of the world as viewed by the ancient Greek philosopher Epicurus (see Epicureanism).

The manuscript found by Poggio is not extant, but fortunately, he sent the copy to his friend Niccolò de' Niccoli, who made a transcription in his renowned book hand (as Niccoli was the creator of italic script), which became the model for the more than fifty other copies circulating at the time. Poggio would later complain that Niccoli had not returned his original copy for 14 years. Later, two 9th-century manuscripts were discovered, the O (the Codex Oblongus, copied c. 825) and Q (the Codex Quadratus), now kept at Leiden University. The book was first printed in 1473.

The Pulitzer Prize-winning 2011 book The Swerve: How the World Became Modern by Stephen Greenblatt is a narrative of the discovery of the old Lucretius manuscript by Poggio. Greenblatt analyzes the poem's subsequent impact on the development of the Renaissance, the Reformation, and modern science.

== Friends ==
Poggio cultivated and maintained throughout his life close friendships with some of the most important learned men of the age: Niccolò de' Niccoli (the inventor of the italic script), Leonardo Bruni ("Leonardo Aretino"), Lorenzo and Cosimo de' Medici, Carlo Marsuppini ("Carlo Aretino"), Guarino Veronese, Ambrogio Traversari, Francesco Barbaro, Francesco Accolti, Feltrino Boiardo, Lionello d'Este (who became Marquis of Ferrara, 1441–1450), and many others, who all shared his passion for retrieving the manuscripts and art of the ancient Greco-Roman world. His early friendship with Tommaso da Sarzana stood Poggio in good stead when his learned friend was elected pope, under the name of Nicolas V (1447−1455), a proven protector of scholars and an active sponsor of learning, who founded the Vatican Library in 1448 with 350 codices.

These learned men maintained an extended network of personal relations among a circle of scholars in which constant communication was secured by an immense traffic of epistolary exchanges.

They were bent on creating a rebirth of intellectual life for Italy by means of a vital reconnection with the texts of antiquity. Their worldview was eminently characteristic of Italian humanism in the earlier Italian Renaissance, which eventually spread all over Western Europe and led to the full Renaissance and the Reformation, announcing the modern age.

== Legacy ==
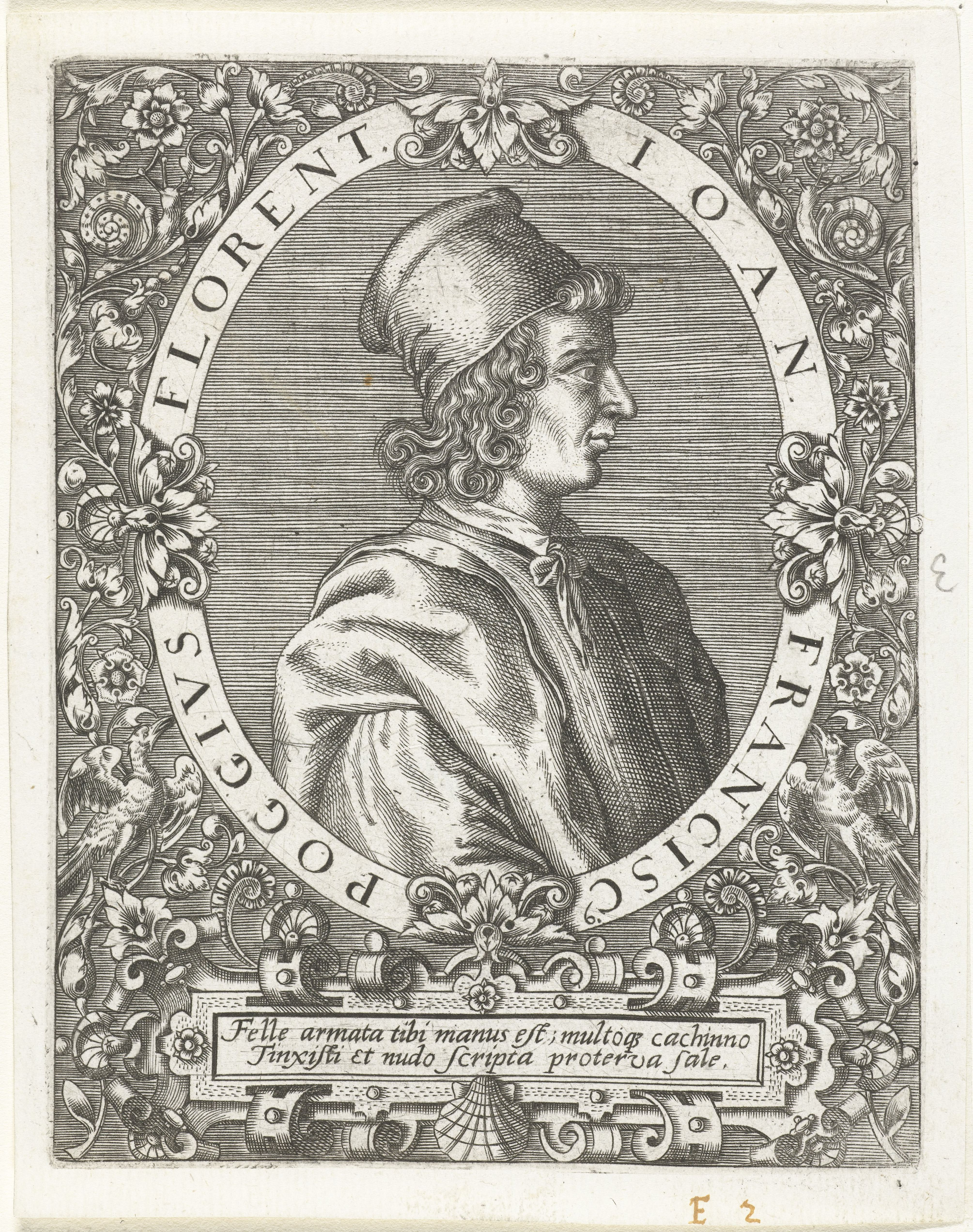
1597 engraving of Poggio Bracciolini

=== Works ===
Poggio, like Aeneas Sylvius Piccolomini (who became Pius II), was a traveller, and wherever he went he brought powers of observation trained in studies to bear upon the manners of the countries he visited.

In literature he embraced the whole sphere of contemporary studies, and distinguished himself as an orator, a writer of rhetorical treatises, a panegyrist of the dead, a passionate impugner of the living, a sarcastic polemist, a translator from the Greek, an epistolographer and grave historian and a facetious compiler of fabliaux in Latin.

His cultural/social/moral essays covered a wide range of subjects concerning the interests and values of his time:

- De avaritia (On Greed, 1428−29) - Poggio's first major work. The old school of biographers (Shepherd, Walser) and historians saw in it a traditional condemnation of avarice. Modern historians tend, on the contrary—especially if studying the economic growth of the Italian Trecento and Quattrocento—to read it as a precocious statement of early capitalism, at least in its Florentine form — breaking through the hold of medieval values that disguised the realities of interest and loans in commerce to proclaim the social utility of wealth. It is the voice of a new age linking wealth, personal worth, conspicuous expenditure, ownership of valuable goods and objects, and social status, a voice not recognized until the late 20th century.;
- An seni sit uxor ducenda (On Marriage in Old Age, 1436);
- De infelicitate principum (On the Unhappiness of Princes, 1440);
- De nobilitate (On Nobility, 1440): Poggio, a self-made man, defends true nobility as based on virtue rather than birth, an expression of the meritocracy favored by the rich bourgeoisie;
- De varietate fortunae (On the Vicissitudes of Fortune, 1447);
- Contra hypocritas (Against Hypocrisy, 1448);
- Historia disceptativa convivialis (Historical discussions between guests after a meal) in three parts (1450):

1) on expressions of thanks
2) on the dignity of medical versus legal profession (a reprise of Salutati's 1398 treatment of the same subject, De Nobilitate Legum et Medicinae): Niccolo Niccoli, appealing to the lessons of experience, is arguing that laws are imposed by the will of the stronger to hold the state together − not God-given to rulers, nor a fact of nature − leading biographer Ernst Walser to conclude that "Poggio, in his writing, presents Machiavellism before Machiavelli."
3) on literate Latin versus vernacular Latin in classical Rome; Poggio concludes that they were both the same language, not two distinct idioms.

- De miseria humanae conditionis (On the Misery of Human Life, 1455), reflections in his retirement in Florence inspired by the sack of Constantinople.

These compositions, all written in Latin − and reviving the classical form of dialogues, between himself and learned friends − belonged to a genre of socratic reflections which, since Petrarch set the fashion, was highly praised by Italian men of letters and made Poggio famous throughout Italy. They exemplify his conception of studia humanitatis as an epitome of human knowledge and wisdom reserved only to the most learned, and the key to what the ancient philosophers called "virtue" and "the good". And thus, they are invaluable windows into the knowledge and Weltanschauung of his age − geography, history, politics, morals, social aspects — and the emergence of the new values of the "Humanist Movement". They are loaded with rich nuggets of fact embedded in subtle disquisitions, with insightful comments, brilliant illustrations, and a wide display of historical and contemporary references. Poggio was always inclined to make objective observations and clinical comparisons between various cultural mores, for instance ancient Roman practices versus modern ones, or Italians versus the English. He compared the eloquence of Jerome of Prague and his fortitude before death with ancient philosophers. The abstruse points of theology presented no interest to him, only the social impact of the Church did, mostly as an object of critique and ridicule. On the Vicissitudes of Fortune became famous for including in book IV an account of the 25-year voyage of the Venetian adventurer Niccolo de' Conti in Persia and India, which was translated into Portuguese on express command of the Portuguese King Emmanuel I. An Italian translation was made from the Portuguese.

Poggio's Historia Florentina (History of Florence), is a history of the city from 1350 to 1455, written in avowed imitation of Livy and Sallust, and possibly Thucydides (available in Greek, but translated into Latin by Valla only in 1450–52) in its use of speeches to explain decisions. Poggio continued Leonardo Bruni's History of the Florentine People, which closed in 1402, and is considered the first modern history book. Poggio limited his focus to external events, mostly wars, in which Florence was the defensor Tusciae and of Italian liberty. But Poggio also pragmatically defended Florence's expansionist policies to insure the "safety of the Florentine Republic", which became the key motive of its history, as a premonition of Machiavelli's doctrine. Conceding to superior forces becomes an expression of reason and advising it a mark of wisdom. His intimate and vast experience of Italian affairs inculcated in him a strong sense of realism, echoing his views on laws expressed in his second Historia disceptativa convivialis (1450). Poggio's beautiful rhetorical prose turns his Historia Florentina into a vivid narrative, with a sweeping sense of movement, and a sharp portrayal of the main characters, but it also exemplifies the limitations of the newly emerging historical style, which, in the work of Leonardo Bruni, Carlo Marsuppini and Pietro Bembo, retained "romantic" aspects and did not reach yet the weight of objectivity later expected by the school of modern historians (especially since 1950).

His Liber Facetiarum (1438−1452), or Facetiae, a collection of humorous and indecent tales expressed in the purest Latin Poggio could command, are the works most enjoyed today: they are available in several English translations. This book is chiefly remarkable for its unsparing satires on the monastic orders and the secular clergy. "The worst men in the world live in Rome, and worse than the others are the priests, and the worst of the priests they make cardinals, and the worst of all the cardinals is made pope." Poggio's book became an internationally popular work in all countries of Western Europe, and has gone through multiple editions until modern times.

In addition Poggio's works included his Epistolae, a collection of his letters, an insightful witness of his age, in which he gave full play to his talent as chronicler of events, to his wide range or interests, and to his most acerbic critical sense.

=== Revival of Latin and Greek ===
In the way of many humanists of his time, Poggio rejected the vernacular Italian and wrote only in Latin, translating works from Greek into that language. He wrote letters that were personal attacks on his enemies and colleagues utilizing expressions of prose and details that would charm the reader through humor.

Poggio was fluent in Latin, and his writing was noted for its classical style inspired by Cicero. Italy was emerging from what Petrarch had termed the Dark Ages, while Poggio was facing the unique challenge of making "those frequent allusions to the customs and transactions of his own times, which render his writings so interesting... at a period when the Latin language was just rescued from the grossest barbarism... the writings of Poggio are truly astonishing. Rising to a degree of elegance, to be sought for in vain in the rugged Latinity of Petrarca and Coluccio Salutati..." Despite the limited libraries of the time, when books were rare and expensive, he cultivated a wide knowledge of ancient authors and a variety of genres.

Good instruction in Greek was uncommon and hard to obtain in Italy. Proficient teachers, such as Ambrogio Traversari, were few and highly valued. Manuel Chrysoloras used to be occasionally credited as having instructed Poggio in Greek during his youth, but Shepherd cites a letter by Poggio to Niccolò Niccoli stating that he began the study of Greek in 1424, in Rome at age 44 (Shepherd, p. 6). Poggio's preface to his dialogue On Avarice notes that his task was made the harder "because I can neither translate from the Greek language for our benefit, nor are my abilities such that I should wish to discuss in public anything drawn from these writings" Consequently, his knowledge of Greek never attained the quality of his Latin. His best-efforts translation of Xenophon's Cyropaedia into Latin cannot be praised for accuracy by modern standards. But he was the first critic to label it a "political romance", instead of history. His son Jacopo Bracciolini used this Latin translation to produce an Italian version. Poggio also translated Lucian's Ass, considered an influence of Apuleius's Latin masterpiece, The Golden Ass.

=== Invectives ===
Among contemporaries he passed for one of the most formidable polemical or gladiatorial rhetoricians; and a considerable section of his extant works is occupied by a brilliant display of his sarcastic wit and his unlimited inventiveness in "invectives". One of these, published on the strength of Poggio's old friendship with the new pontiff, Nicolas V, the dialogue Against Hypocrites, was actuated by a vindictive hatred at the follies and vices of ecclesiastics. This was but another instance of his lifelong obstinate denouncing of the corruption of clerical life in the 15th century. Nicholas V then asked Poggio to deliver a philippic against Amadeus VIII, Duke of Savoy, who claimed to be the Antipope Felix V — a ferocious attack with no compunction in pouring on the Duke fantastic accusations, unrestrained abuse and the most extreme anathemas.

Invectivae ("Invectives") were a specialized literary genre used during the Italian Renaissance, tirades of exaggerated obloquy aimed at insulting and degrading an opponent beyond the bounds of any common decency. Poggio's most famous "Invectives" were those he composed in his literary quarrels, such as with George of Trebizond, Bartolomeo Facio, and Antonio Beccadelli, the author of a scandalous Hermaphroditus, inspired by the unfettered eroticism of Catullus and Martial. All the resources of Poggio's rich vocabulary of the most scurrilous Latin were employed to stain the character of his target; every imaginable crime was imputed to him, and the most outrageous accusations proffered, without any regard to plausibility. Poggio's quarrels against Francesco Filelfo and also Niccolo Perotti pitted him against well-known scholars.

=== Humanist script ===
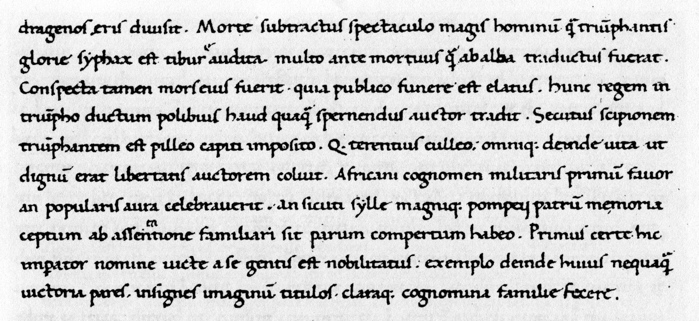
a sample of Poggio's handwriting

Poggio was famous for his beautiful and legible book hand. Berthold Louis Ullman identified him as the inventor of the type writing known as Humanist minuscule, which gave rise at the end of the fourteenth century to Roman type, which remains popular today.

Recent research by Teresa De Robertis and others has shown that other scribes had used Humanist minuscule before Poggio. So Poggio did not invent the new script, but he was one of the most prolific and distinguished scribes to use it so soon after its development, and his influence no doubt helped it spread through Italy.

== Works ==
- Poggii Florentini oratoris et philosophi Opera : collatione emendatorum exemplarium recognita, quorum elenchum versa haec pagina enumerabit, Heinrich Petri ed., (apud Henricum Petrum, Basel, 1538)
- Poggius Bracciolini Opera Omnia, Riccardo Fubini ed., 4 vol. Series: Monumenta politica et philosophica rariora. (Series 2, 4–7; Torino, Bottega d'Erasmo, 1964–1969)
- Poggii Bracciolini Florentini Historiae de Varietate Fortunae Libri Quatuor, The Stories of Fortune's Vicissitudes, Latin and English, Leo Perlov transl. (Independently Published, 2023)
- Epistolae, Tommaso Tonelli ed. (3 vol., 1832–61); Riccardo Fubini ed. (1982, re-edition of vol. III of Opera Omnia)
- Poggio Bracciolini Lettere, Helen Harth ed., Latin and Italian, (3 vol., Florence: Leo S. Olschki, 1984–7)
- The Facetiae, Bernhardt J. Hurwood transl. (Award Books, 1968)
- Facetiae of Poggio and other medieval story-tellers, Edward Storer transl., (London: G. Routledge & Sons & New York: E.P. Dutton, 1928) Online version
- Phyllis Goodhart Gordan transl., Two Renaissance Book Hunters: The Letters of Poggius Bracciolini to Nicolaus De Niccolis (Columbia Un. Press, 1974, 1991)
- Beda von Berchem transl., The infallibility of the Pope at the Council of Constance; the trial of Hus, his sentence and death at the stake, in two letters, (C. Granville, 1930) (The authenticity of this work is in debate since the earliest edition discovered was in German in the 1840s.)
