= Santo Spirito, Florence =

Church in Florence, Italy

Basilica of the Holy Spirit Basilica di Santo Spirito (in Italian)
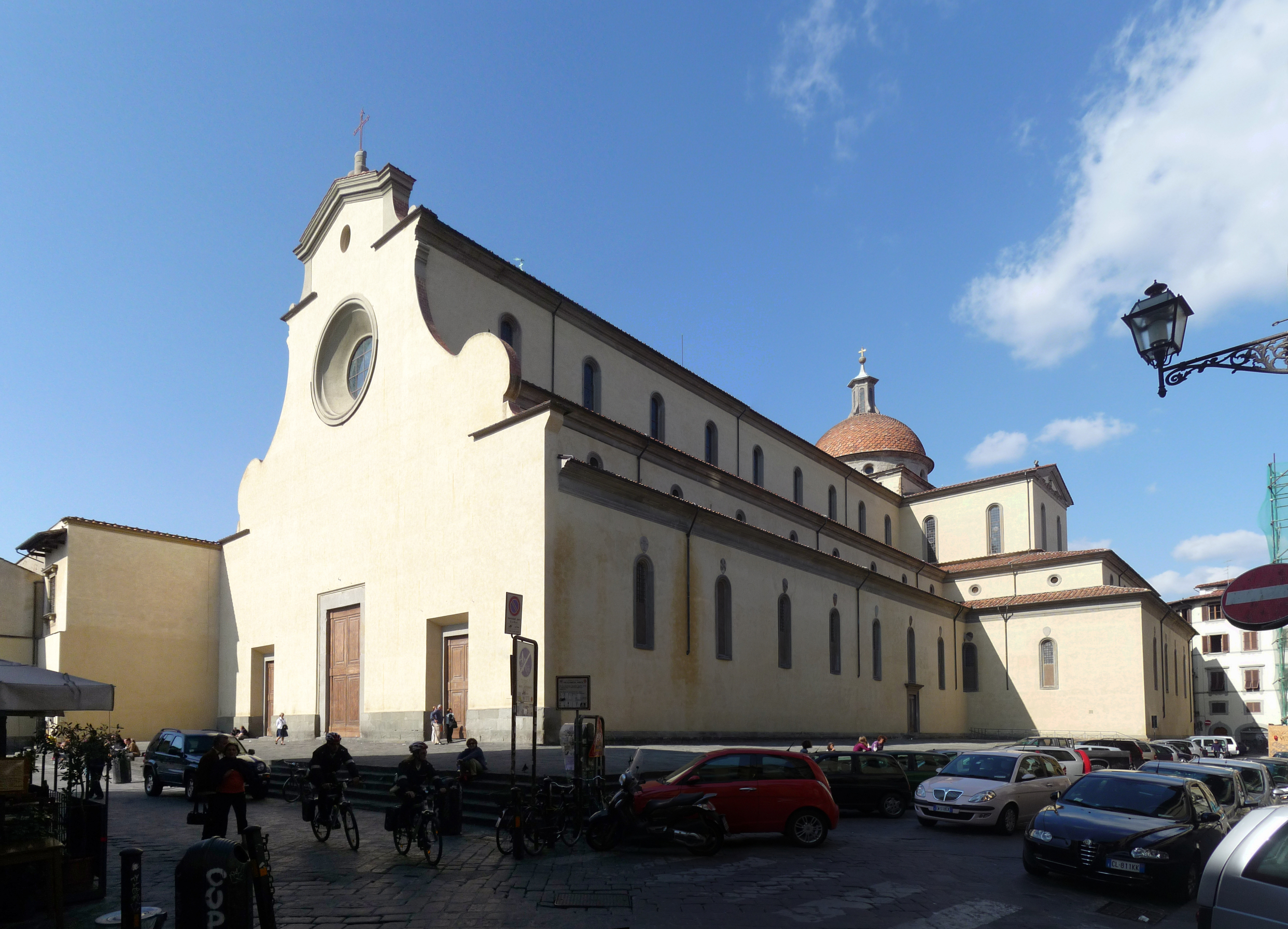
- View of the Basilica.

Religion
- Affiliation: Roman Catholic
- Diocese: Archdiocese of Florence
- Ecclesiastical or organizational status: Minor basilica
- Year consecrated: 1481

Location
- Location: Florence, Tuscany, Italy
- Interactive map of Basilica of the Holy Spirit; Basilica di Santo Spirito (in Italian)
- Coordinates: 43°46′2.2″N 11°14′53.7″E

Architecture
- Architects: Filippo Brunelleschi, Antonio Manetti, Giovanni da Gaiole, Salvi d'Andrea
- Type: Church
- Style: Renaissance
- Groundbreaking: 1444
- Completed: 1487

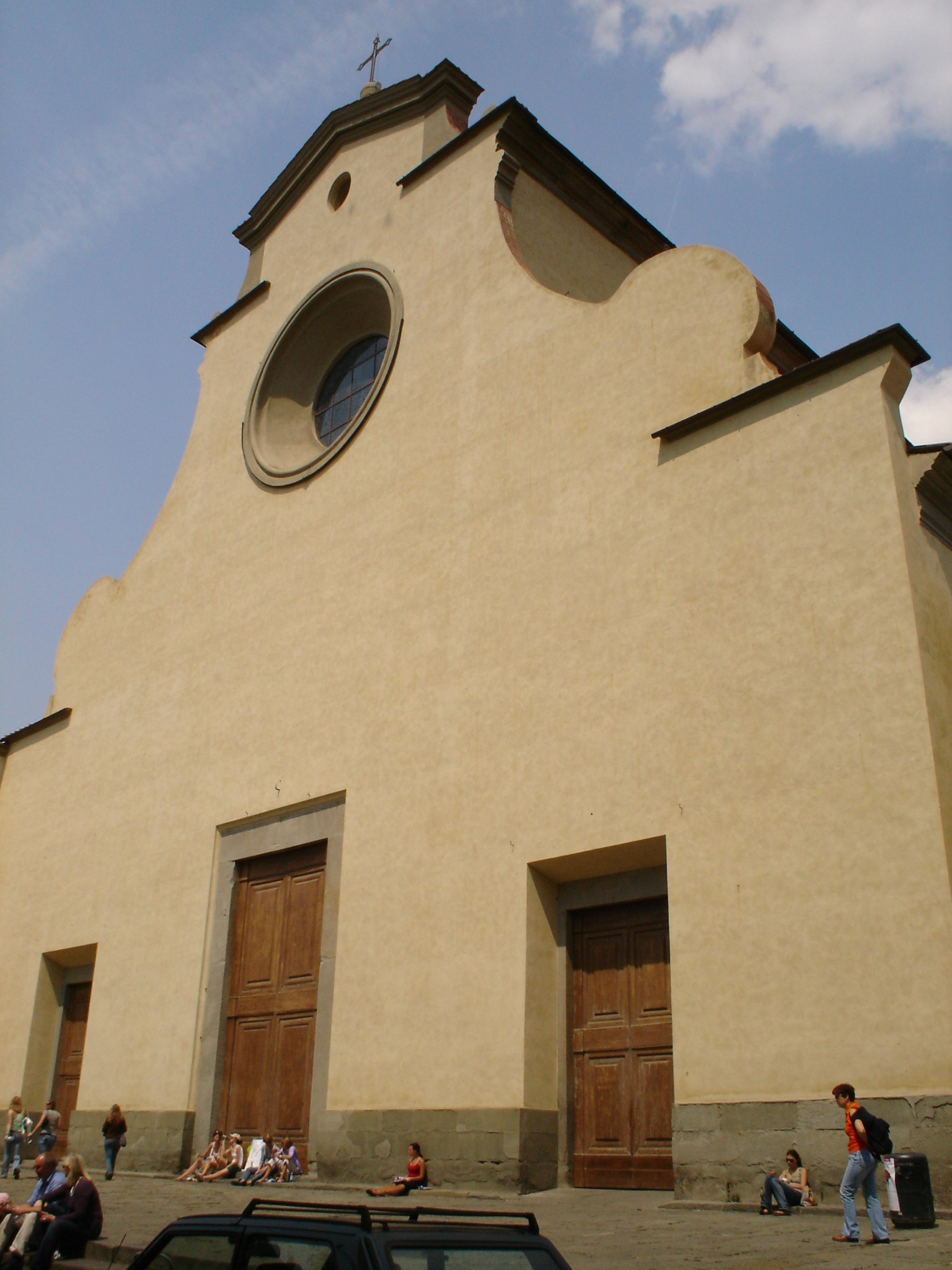
Main facade

The Basilica di Santo Spirito ("Basilica of the Holy Spirit") is a church in Florence, Italy. Usually referred to simply as Santo Spirito, it is located in the Oltrarno quarter, facing the square with the same name. The interior of the building – internal length 97 m (318 ft) – is one of the preeminent examples of Renaissance architecture.

== History ==
Interior of the basilica

=== Early history ===
The land for the Augustinian church and convent was donated by Speziale and Acolti to Aldebrandino, a prior of the Augustinian establishment in Arcetri in 1250. The plot was located on the south bank of Arno in the sesto (one of the six sestieri of Florence) Oltrarno, within the communal walls of 1173–1175, but in a sparsely populated area. It became more accessible with construction of the Holy Trinity bridge (Ponte Santa Trinita) in 1252. The Augustinians started the church and the convent in the same year, incorporating an old church of San Romolo in the complex. It was originally dedicated to Mary, All Saints and the Holy Spirit, changing by the end of the century to Mary, the Holy Spirit and Matthew.

The churches and convents of mendicant orders were constructed with the financial support of the commune, which provided funds for Santo Spirito in 1267, and then from 1292 to 1301.

The convent of S. Spirito became a center of scholarly activities and was recognized as Studium Generale of the Augustinian order in 1284. The first Rule and Constitutions of the Augustinians were approved in 1287 by the general chapter of the order that was held in Florence.

Houses were purchased in 1301 to produce a public square in front of the church — the Piazza Santo Spirito. By 1310 Santo Spirito had seven altars and a number of family chapels. More chapels were built during the next hundred years. By mid-century Santo Spirito was a very substantial complex, including a large first cloister. A Crucifixion and The Last Supper were frescoed by Andrea Orcagna and his workshop in the 1360s.

The confraternity of Santa Maria delle Laude (laudese), dedicated to the Virgin Mary and her praise was founded before 1322. It was staging an annual Pentecost play celebrating the descent of the Holy Spirit to the Apostles. It also was involved in charity: friar Simone Fidati da Cascia directed the laudese foundation of a house for former prostitutes. In 1333 it already housed more than fifty women.

Santo Spirito was associated with the early humanism in Florence. One of the groups, led by Boccaccio, gathered there in 1360s and the 1370s. Upon his death in 1375 Boccaccio bequeathed his library to the convent. In the 1380s and early 1390s another circle of humanists met daily in the cell of Luigi Marsili (1342–94). Marsili had studied philosophy and theology at the Universities of Padua and Paris. He came into contact with Petrarch at Padua in 1370 and later became a friend of Boccaccio. This group included Coluccio Salutati (1331–1406), Chancellor of Florence from 1375. He soon became the central figure of the circle. The most important of Salutati disciples was Leonardo Bruni (1370–1444), the future Chancellor of Florence. Another member of the circle was Niccolò de' Niccoli, a humanist and an associate of Cosimo Medici.

Santo Spirito was a scene of several dramatic events during the period of political instability of 1370s. As the only area of the city located across the Arno, the sieste (from 1343 the quarter) of Santo Spirito was physically and politically apart from the rest of Florence. Among its inhabitants were some of the most prominent and ancient families of the city, such as the Capponi, the Soderini, and Frescobaldi, as well as some of the poorest unskilled laborers. This politically explosive mix gave to the quarter its image of one of the most ready to rebel.

One of the most sensational political assassinations in the history of the Republic of Florence was a murder of Sandro da Quarata, a prominent member of the Ricci faction, in November 1370, when he was exiting the church after mass. In the lead up-to the Ciompi revolt the monastery was attacked by rioters on 22 June 1378, but defended by the forces loyal to the signoria. Interrogations of the conspirators arrested on 19 July ( at the last-ditch attempt of the government to stomp the uprising), indicate the planned uprising was to be staged in four separate revolts, with the largest (involving a thousand men) in the church of S. Spirito.

After the Florentine victory over the Milanese in 1397 during the second Milan war on the feast day of Saint Augustine (28 August), the signoria decided to rebuild the church to honor the saint, placing it under the patronage of the city. Despite this decision, nothing much happened until 1434, when the operai retained the services of Filippo Brunelleschi. Work on the new church progressed slowly until March 1471. During the sacra rappresentazione "Descent of the Holy Spirit" organized by the laudese in honor of the visit of Galeazzo Maria Sforza the old church caught fire and was heavily damaged, together with parts of the convent.

=== The new church ===
Filippo Brunelleschi began designs for the new building as early as 1428. The first pillars to the building were delivered in 1446, ten days before his death. After his death, the works were carried on by his followers Antonio Manetti, Giovanni da Gaiole, and Salvi d'Andrea; the latter was also responsible for the construction of the cupola.

Unlike S. Lorenzo, where Brunelleschi's ideas were thwarted, here, his ideas were carried through with some degree of fidelity, at least in the ground plan and up to the level of the arcades. The Latin cross plan is so designed to maximize the legibility of the grid. The contrast between nave and transept that caused such difficulty at S. Lorenzo was here also avoided. The side chapels, in the form of niches all the same size (forty in all), run along the entire perimeter of the space.

Brunelleschi's facade was never built and left blank. In 1489, a columned vestibule and octagonal sacristy, designed by Simone del Pollaiolo, known as Il Cronaca, and Giuliano da Sangallo respectively, were built to the left of the building. A door was opened up in a chapel to make the connection to the church.

A Baroque baldachin with polychrome marbles was added by Giovanni Battista Caccini and Gherardo Silvani over the high altar, in 1601. The church remained undecorated until the 18th century, when the walls were plastered. The inner façade is by Salvi d'Andrea, and has still the original glass window with the Pentecost designed by Pietro Perugino. The bell tower (1503) was designed by Baccio d'Agnolo.

The exterior of the building was restored in 1977–78.

== Chapel altarpieces ==
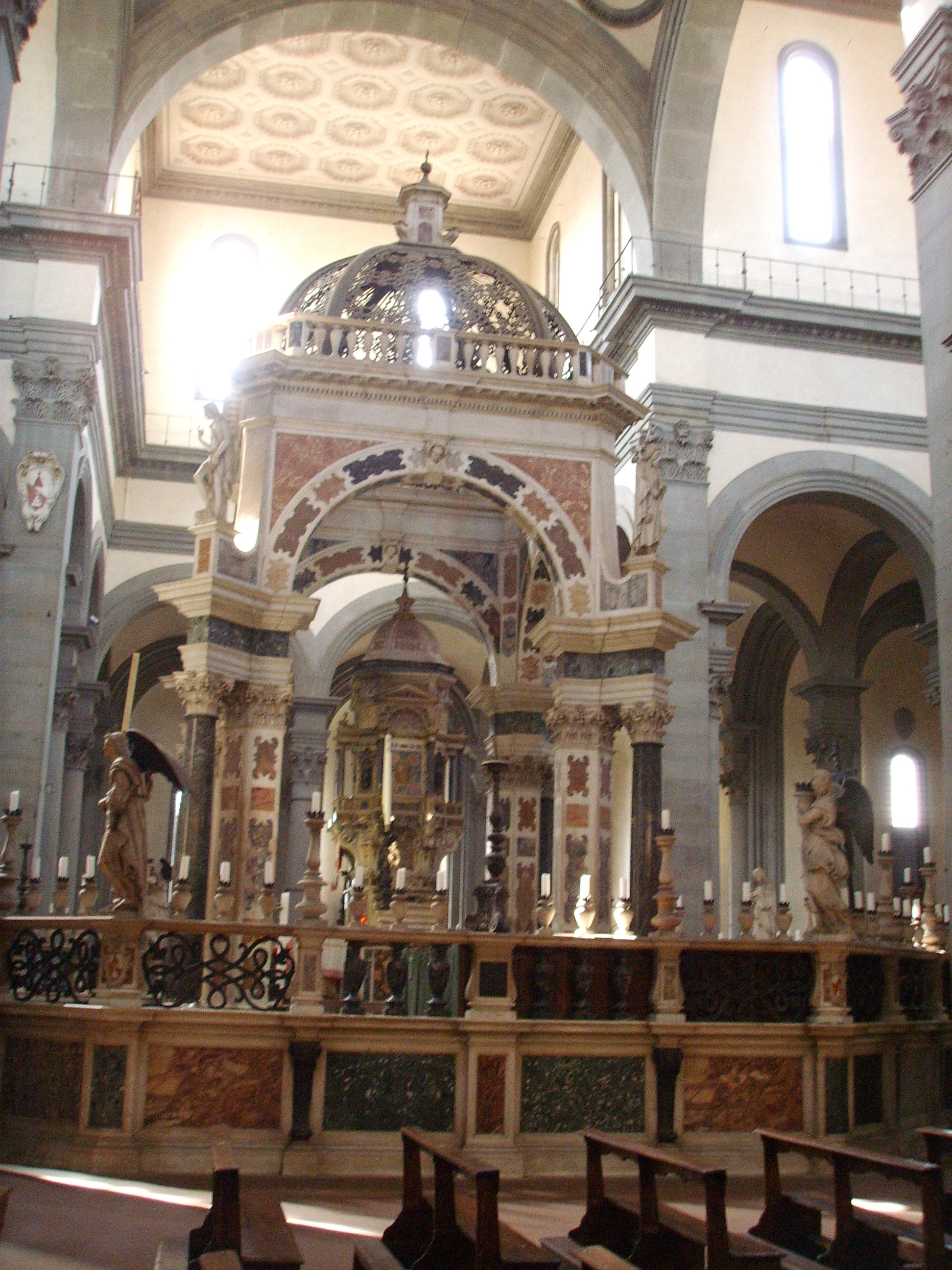
Baldachin over the high altar

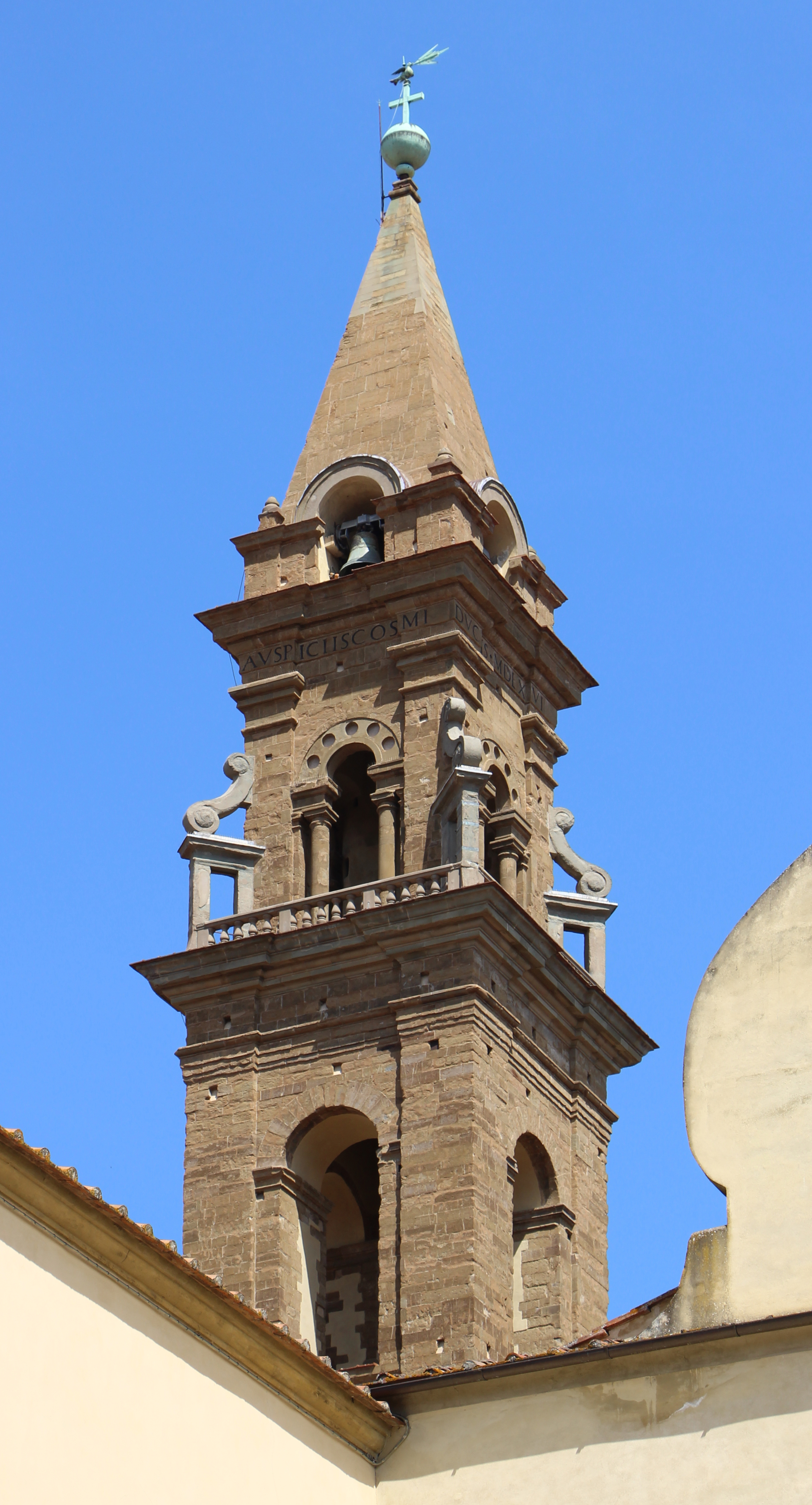
Bell tower

The church has 38 side chapels (two chapels having been given over to doors), which contain a noteworthy amount of artworks. The most significant is the Bini-Capponi Chapel, housing the St. Monica Establishing the Rule of the Augustinian Nuns painting by Francesco Botticini. The Corbinelli chapels works are by Andrea Sansovino, Cosimo Rosselli and Donnino and Agnolo del Mazziere.

In the chapels of the transept are altarpieces by Filippino Lippi. Also in the transept is a choir from which the Frescobaldi Marquisses could participate in the rites without being seen by the crowd.

The sacristy, accessed through a doorway in what would have been the left sixth chapel preceded by a monumental vestibule by Simone del Pollaiolo, was designed by Giuliano da Sangallo in 1489, and has an octagonal plan. It is home to a devotional painting of St. Fiacre curing the Sick (1597) by Alessandro Allori (1596) commissioned by Christine of Lorraine, Grand Duke Ferdinando I de' Medici's wife.

=== List of chapels and their works of art ===
The 38 chapels and their works of art are:

Side	Chapel	Artworks
R	1 (nave near facade)	Disputa dell'Immacolata Concezione by Pier Francesco Foschi
R	2	Copy of Michelangelo's Pietà (1549) by Nanni di Baccio Bigio
R	3	St. Niccolò da Tolentino by Nanni Unghero; flanking angels by Franciabigio
R	4	Expulsion of the Money Changers from Temple (1572) by Giovanni Stradano
R	5	Coronation of the Virgin (c. 1694) by Alessandro Gherardini
R	6	Martyrdom of St. Stephen (1602) by Domenico Passignano
R	7	Tobias and Angel (1698) by Giovanni Baratta
R	9 (transept)	Transfiguration by Pier Francesco Foschi
R	10 (transept)	Madonna del Soccorso (15th century)
R	11 (transept)	Altar by Bernardo Buontalenti
R	12 (transept)	Madonna and Child with Saints and Nerli Family Donors (1488) by Filippino Lippi
R	13 (transept)	Copy of Perugino's Apparition of the Virgin to St. Bernard by Felice Ficherelli
R	14	Marble sarcophagus (c. 1457) by Antonio Rossellino
R	15 (apse)	Madonna with SS. John Evangelist & Jerome (early 16th century)
R	16 (apse)	Madonna with child & 4 saints (c. 1340) by Maso di Banco
R	18 (apse)	Martyrdom of the ten thousand (1574) by Alessandro Allori with altarpiece of St. Lucy with two angels (c. 1460) attributed to Neri di Bicci
L	1 (nave)	Resurrection by Pier Francesco Foschi
L	2	Copy of Michelangelo's Christ (1579) by Taddeo Landini
L	5	Madonna, St. Anne, and other saints by Michele Tosini
L	8	Madonna enthroned with SS Lawrence, Giovanni Gualberto, Catherine, & Bernard by follower of Fra Bartolomeo
L	9 (transept)	Way to Calvary by Michele Tosini; window Doubting Thomas attributed to Bartolomeo di Giovanni
L	10 (transept)	Madonna Enthroned with Saints (1505) by Raffaellino del Garbo with altarpiece of St. Lawrence distributing alms by Jacopo del Sellaio
L	11 (transept)	Madonna Enthroned with Angels and Saints Bartholemew and Nicholas by Raffaellino del Garbo
L	12 (transept)	Trinity adored by Saints Catherine and Mary Magdalene (c. 1485) by Francesco Granacci
L	13 (transept)	Corbinelli altar (1492) by Andrea Sansovino
L	14 (transept)	Madonna Enthroned and Child with Saints (1482) by Cosimo Rosselli, altarpiece of Doubting Thomas attributed to Neri di Bicci
L	15 (transept)	St. Monica Establishes the Rule of Augustinian Nuns (1483) attributed to Francesco Botticini
L	16 (transept)	Madonna and Child and Saints attributed to Raffaellino del Garbo
L	15 (apse)	Nativity by a follower of Domenico Ghirlandaio
L	16 (apse)	Annunciation (late 15th century)
L	18 (apse)	Christ and the Adultress (1577) by Alessandro Allori

== Michelangelo's Crucifix ==
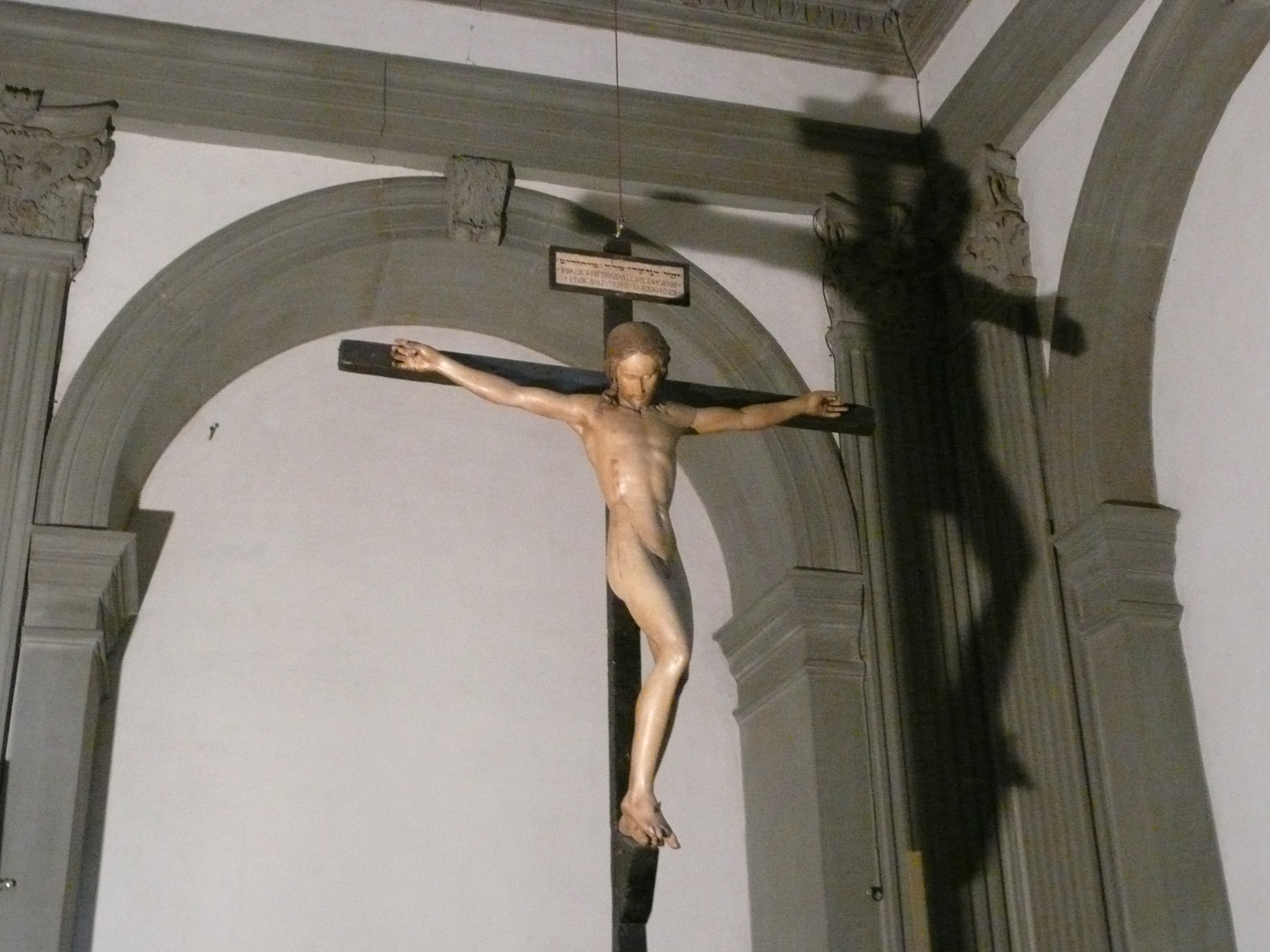
Michelangelo's Crucifix

Michelangelo Buonarroti, when he was seventeen years old, was allowed to make anatomical studies on the corpses coming from the convent's hospital; in exchange, he sculpted a wooden crucifix which was placed over the high altar. Today the crucifix is in the octagonal sacristy that can be reached from the west aisle of the church.

== The cloisters and the Cenacolo ==
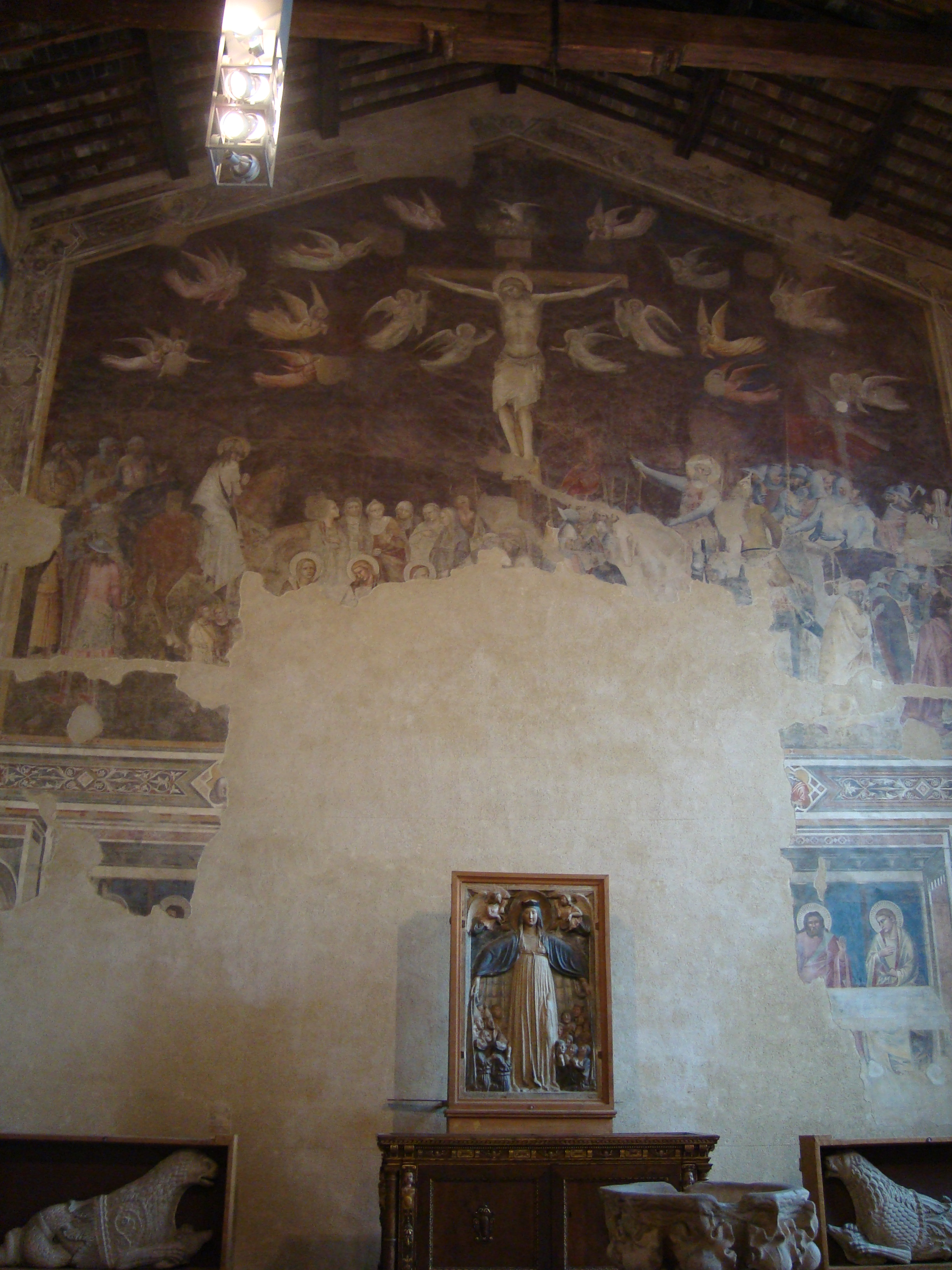
Santo Spirito's Cenacolo

The convent had two cloisters, called Chiostro dei Morti and Chiostro Grande ("Cloister of the Dead" and "Grand Cloister"). The first takes its name from the great number of tombstone decorating its walls, and was built around 1600 by Alfonso Parigi. The latter was constructed in 1564–1569 by Bartolomeo Ammannati in a classicistic style.

The former convent also contains the great refectory (Cenacolo di Santo Spirito) with a large fresco portraying the Crucifixion over a fragmentary Last Supper, both attributed to Andrea Orcagna (1360–1365). It is one of the rare examples of Late Gothic Art which can still be seen in Florence. The room also boasts a collection of sculptures from the 11th–15th centuries, including two low reliefs by Donatello, a high relief by Jacopo della Quercia (Madonna with Child) and two marble sculptures by Tino da Camaino (1320–1322).

== Burials ==
- Paolo Uccello, in his father's tomb
- Niccolò de' Niccoli

== See also ==
- Late medieval domes
- Italian Renaissance domes
