= Manuel Chrysoloras =

Byzantine Greek scholar, diplomat, and professor (c. 1350–1415)

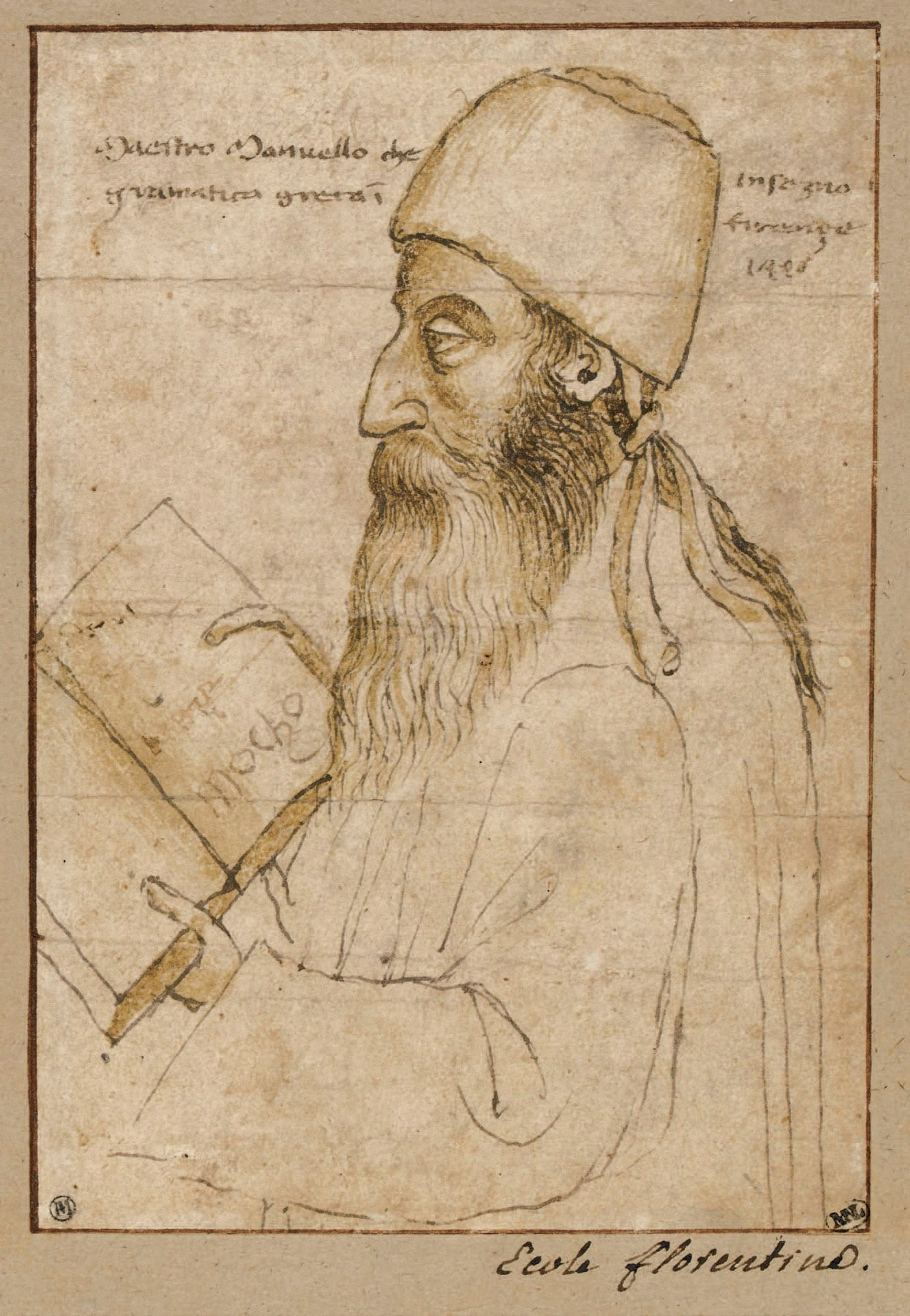
- Manuel Chrysoloras portrayed by Paolo Uccello in 1408. Drawing currently preserved in the Louvre Museum, Paris.
- Born: c. 1350; Constantinople, Byzantine Empire
- Died: 15 April 1415; Free imperial city of Constance (modern-day Konstanz, Germany)
- Occupations: Diplomat, educator, scholar, and professor
- Years active: 1390–1415
- Known for: Translating works of Homer, Aristotle, and Plato into Latin
- Notable work: Erotemata Civas Questiones

Manuel (or Emmanuel) Chrysoloras (Greek: Μανουὴλ Χρυσολωρᾶς; c. 1350 – 15 April 1415) was a Byzantine Greek classical scholar, humanist, philosopher, professor, and translator of ancient Greek texts during the Renaissance. Serving as the ambassador for the Byzantine emperor Manuel II Palaiologos in medieval Italy, he became a renowned teacher of Greek literature and history in the republics of Florence and Venice, and today he's widely regarded as a pioneer in the introduction of ancient Greek literature to Western Europe during the Late Middle Ages.

== Biography ==
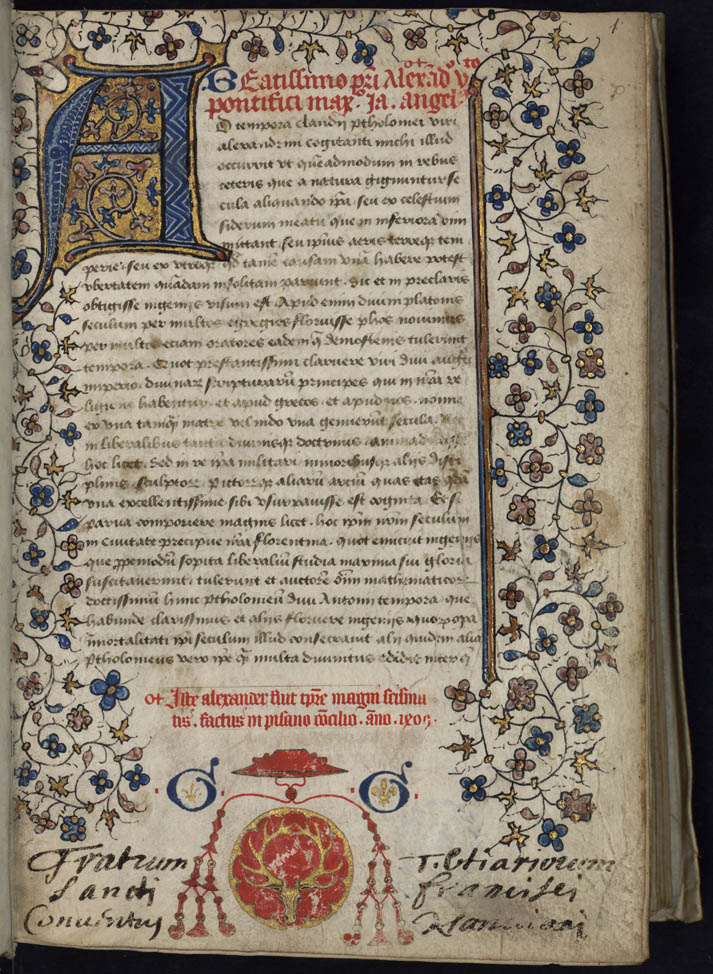
Jacopo d'Angelo's Latin translation of Ptolemy's Geography (c. 1411–1427); scan from the Nancy Library.

Chrysoloras was born in Constantinople, at the time capital of the Byzantine Empire, to a distinguished Greek Orthodox family. In 1390, he led an embassy sent to the Republic of Venice by the Byzantine emperor Manuel II Palaiologos to ask the aid of the Christian princes of Medieval Europe against the invasions of the Byzantine Empire by the Muslim Ottoman Turks. Roberto de' Rossi of Florence met him in Venice, and, in 1395, Rossi's acquaintance Jacopo d'Angelo set off for Constantinople to study Greek with Chrysoloras. In 1396, Coluccio Salutati, the Chancellor of Florence, invited him to Florence to teach Greek grammar and literature. In a letter to Poggio Bracciolini, quoting the Roman lawyer and statesman Cicero, Salutati wrote:

"The verdict of our own Cicero confirms that we Romans either made wiser innovations than theirs by ourselves or improved on what we took from them, but of course, as he himself says elsewhere with reference to his own day: "Italy is invincible in war, Greece in culture." For our part, and we mean no offence, we firmly believe that both Greeks and Latins have always taken learning to a higher level by extending it to each other's literature."

Chrysoloras arrived in the winter of 1397, an event remembered by one of his most famous pupils, the Italian humanist scholar Leonardo Bruni, as a great new opportunity: there were many teachers of law, but no one had studied Greek in northern Italy for 700 years. Another very famous pupil of Chrysoloras was Ambrogio Traversari, who became general of the Camaldolese order. Chrysoloras remained only a few years in Florence, from 1397 to 1400, teaching Greek, starting with the rudiments. He moved on to teach in Bologna, and later in Venice and Rome. Though he taught widely, a handful of his chosen students remained a close-knit group, among the first humanists of the Renaissance. Among his pupils were numbered some of the foremost figures of the revival of Greek studies in Renaissance Italy. Aside from Bruni, d'Angelo, and Ambrogio Traversari, they included Guarino da Verona, Coluccio Salutati, Roberto Rossi, Niccolò de' Niccoli, Carlo Marsuppini, Pier Paolo Vergerio, Uberto Decembrio, Palla Strozzi, and many others.

Having visited Milan and Pavia, and having resided for several years in Venice, he went to Rome on the invitation of Bruni, who was then secretary to Pope Gregory XII. In 1408, he was sent to Paris on an important mission from the Byzantine emperor Manuel II Palaiologos. In 1413, he went to Germany on an embassy to the Holy Roman Emperor Sigismund, the object of which was to fix a place for the church council that later assembled at Constance. Chrysoloras was on his way there, having been chosen to represent the Greek Church, when he died suddenly. His death gave rise to commemorative essays of which Guarino da Verona made a collection in Chrysolorina.

Chrysoloras translated the works of Homer, Aristotle, and Plato's Republic into Latin. His own works, which circulated in manuscript in his lifetime, include brief works on the Procession of the Holy Ghost, and letters to his brothers, to Bruni, Guarino, Traversari, and to Strozzi, as well as two which were eventually printed, his Erotemata (Questions) which was the first basic Greek grammar in use in Western Europe, first published in 1484 and widely reprinted, and which enjoyed considerable success not only among his pupils in Florence, but also among later leading humanists, being immediately studied by Thomas Linacre at Oxford and by Desiderius Erasmus at Cambridge; and Epistolæ tres de comparatione veteris et novæ Romæ (Three Letters on the Comparison of Old and New Rome, i.e. a comparison of Rome and Constantinople). Many of his treatises on morals and ethics and other philosophical subjects came into print in the 17th and 18th centuries, because of their antiquarian interest. He was chiefly influential through his teaching in familiarizing men such as Leonardo Bruni, Coluccio Salutati, Jacopo d'Angelo, Roberto de' Rossi, Carlo Marsuppini, Pietro Candido Decembrio, Guarino da Verona, with the masterpieces of Western philosophy and ancient Greek literature.

== See also ==
- Byzantine art
- Cretan School
- Byzantine science
- Greek College
- Greek scholars in the Renaissance
- Hellenic Institute of Byzantine and Post-Byzantine Studies
- List of Byzantine scholars
- Renaissance humanism
