= Roberto de' Rossi =

Roberto de' Rossi was an early humanist in Florence, a follower of Coluccio Salutati and, as the first pupil of Manuel Chrysoloras, one of the first Florentines to read Greek. Roberto de' Rossi was a wealthy patrician who never married and avoided public office but devoted his life to books and his studies in his house and garden in the Oltr'Arno district of Florence. His translations of Aristotle and other classical Greek writers made them widely available to the Latin-reading public, but his modern claim to fame is as the tutor of Cosimo de' Medici, a role for which he was selected by Giovanni di Bicci. Roberto's friends Leonardo Bruni and Niccolo Niccoli were inherited by Cosimo and formed part of his circle.
