= Pietro di ser Mino da Montevarchi =

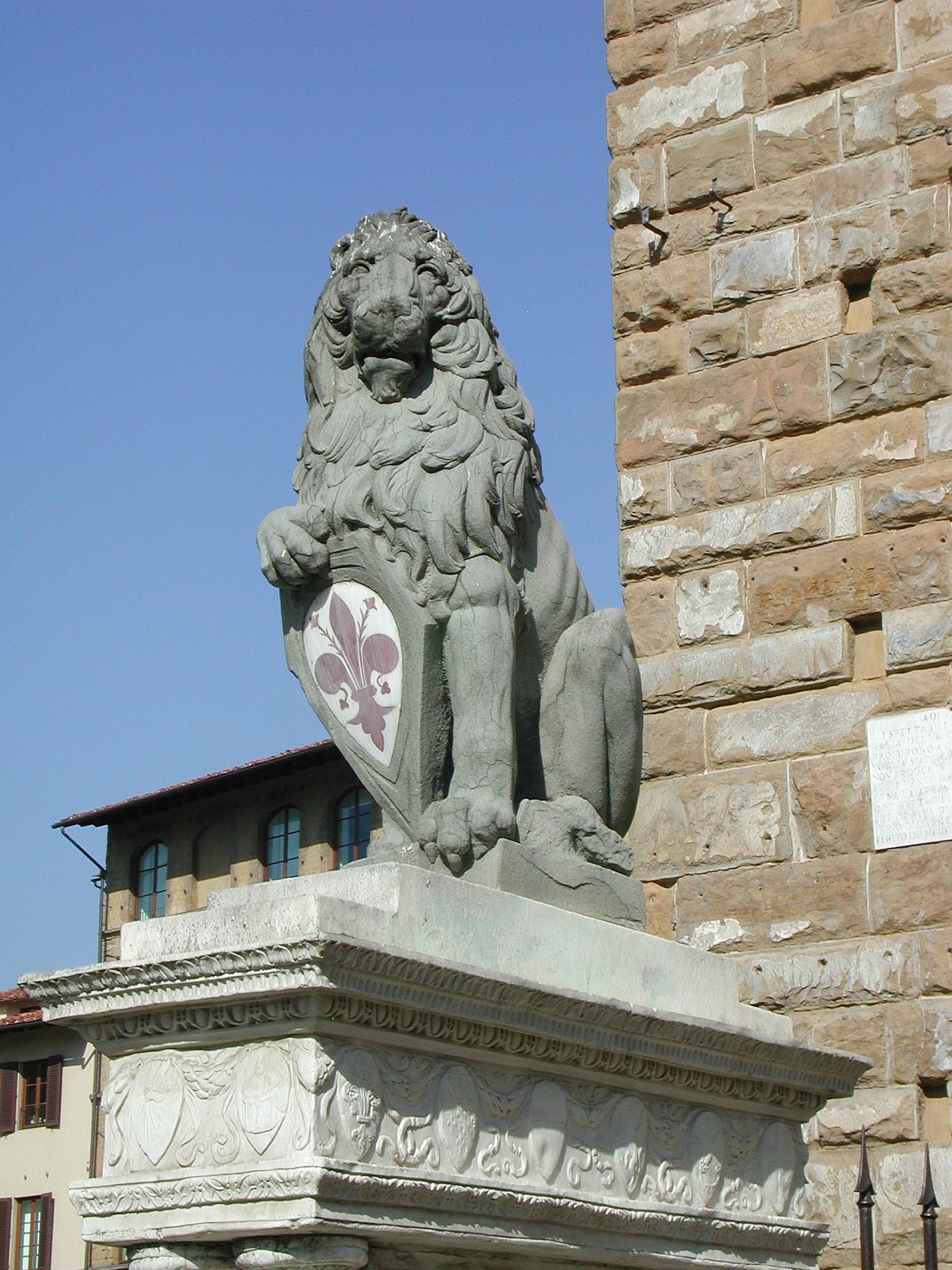
- The Marzocco, as sculpted by Donatello, symbol of the Florentine Republic
- Born: Pietro di ser Mino; Montevarchi
- Died: 18 July 1425; Florence
- Occupations: Jurist, Religious

Pietro di ser Mino da Montevarchi, often referred to in vernacular as Piero or Fiero, was an Italian jurist and religious figure. In Latin, however, he signed as Petrus, indicating that his true name was Pietro. His patronymic was often mistakenly altered to Sermini, but he was simply the son of Ser Mino from Montevarchi.

== Biography ==
Pietro was a student and close associate of Coluccio Salutati. Salutati included Pietro as one of the interlocutors in the second book of his Dialogues to Petrus Paulus Histrus. Upon Salutati's death, the position of Chancellor of the Florentine Republic initially passed to Benedetto Fortini. After Fortini's death seven months later, Pietro was chosen as the natural successor. Despite being an outsider from the contado (rural area), his exceptional skills as a jurist earned him this prestigious role. He served as Chancellor until 1410.

In 1410, Pietro left his political career, passing the chancellorship to Leonardo Bruni of Arezzo. He entered the Church of Santa Brigida al Paradiso, joining the Order of the Most Holy Savior of Saint Bridget and renounced his worldly possessions. Although Pietro was initially terminally ill, he reportedly experienced a miraculous recovery in 1411 following a vision of Saint Bridget. He later became the prior of the monastery.

Even after his conversion, Pietro retained his diplomatic abilities. In 1412, he participated as a negotiator during the final stages of the Western Schism. However, frustrated by political obstacles and the interference of Luigi da Prato, he withdrew from negotiations.

== Legacy ==
Pietro's life bridged the realms of politics, religion, and diplomacy, reflecting the complexities of Renaissance Italy.

== Bibliography ==
- Documenti di Storia Italiana, curated by Deputazione Toscana di Storia Patria, Florence, 1867.
- Walter Binni, La Rassegna della Letteratura Italiana, Sansoni, 1893.
- Epistolario di Coluccio Salutati, edited by Francesco Novati, Rome, Forzani, 1896.
- Maria Sticco, Il Pensiero di S. Bernardino da Siena, Milan, Società Editrice "Vita e Pensiero," 1924.
- Eugenio Garin, La Cultura Filosofica del Rinascimento Italiano: Ricerche e Documenti, Sansoni, 1961.
- Salvatore-Floro Di Zenzo, Saggi su l'Umanesimo: Aspetti delle Controversie fra Humanitas e Pietas nel Secolo XV, Naples, Glaux, 1967.
- Phyllis Walter Goodhart Gordan, Two Renaissance Book Hunters: The Letters of Poggius Bracciolini to Nicolaus de Niccolis, New York, Columbia University Press, 1974.
- Robert Black, Benedetto Accolti and the Florentine Renaissance, Cambridge University Press, 2002.
