= Phyllis Goodhart Gordan =

American book and manuscript collector

- Born: Phyllis Walter Goodhart; October 4, 1913; New York City
- Died: January 24, 1994; New York City
- Education: Bryn Mawr College
- Occupation: Scholar
- Spouse: John Dozier Gordan
- Parent(s): Howard Lehman Goodhart, Marjorie Walter

Phyllis Walter Goodhart Gordan (4 October 1913 - 24 January 1994) was a rare book and manuscript collector and a leading scholar of the Renaissance, known for her research into the life of Poggio Bracciolini.

== Personal life and education ==
Phyllis Walter Goodhart was born on October 4, 1913, to Howard Lehman Goodhart and Marjorie Walter. Phyllis' uncle was Arthur Lehman Goodhart, and her great-grandfather was Mayer Lehman. She attended Brearley School in New York City and then went on to Bryn Mawr College, where she majored in Latin, graduating in 1935. She attended Radcliffe College from 1935 to 1938, receiving her M.A. in Latin, Greek, and paleography. She married John Dozier Gordan in 1938, and they had one son and three daughters.

== Career ==
Gordan's life work of editing, translating, and annotating the letters of Poggio Bracciolini to Niccolò de' Niccoli resulted in the 1974 publication of Two Renaissance Book Hunters (Columbia University Press). Her interest in Renaissance manuscripts and her study of Bracciolini's search for "lost" texts fueled her own collecting. Her father, Howard Lehman Goodhart, supported and encouraged her research by amassing a notable collection of incunabula and Renaissance manuscripts. After her father's death in 1951, Gordan continued to seek out and collect rare materials from the Medieval and Renaissance eras.

Gordan was a Trustee at Bryn Mawr and a founding member of the Friends of the Bryn Mawr College Library in 1951. She was a charter member of The Renaissance Society of America, serving as President from 1967-1968. Gordan was the first woman appointed to the American Academy in Rome's Board of Trustees in 1971. She was also a life long supporter of New York Public Library, serving as a Trustee from 1974 to 1985.

== Death and legacy ==
Gordan died on January 24, 1994. Following her death, The Renaissance Society of America created the Phyllis Goodhart Gordan Book Prize in her memory. The American Academy in Rome awards pre- and post-doctoral student winners of the Rome Prize in Phyllis G. Gordan's name.. In 2016, Bryn Mawr College hosted a symposium dedicated to Gordan's memory, entitled Poggio Bracciolini and the Re(dis)covery of Antiquity: Textual and Material Traditions. Thirty manuscripts from her collection, previously deposited at Bryn Mawr, were offered for sale at Christie's, London, on 10 December 2025, lots 1-30. They included manuscripts of works by Cicero, Lucan, Appian, Aulus Gellius, Josephus, Ovid, Statius, and medieval authors, among others.

== Published works ==
- “The Medieval Library at Bryn Mawr.” The Papers of the Bibliographical Society of America, vol. 46, no. 2, 1952, pp. 87–98.
- Fifteenth Century Books in the Collection of Howard Lehman Goodhart. Stamford: Overbrook Press, 1955.
- "Of What Use are Old Books?" A talk given 4 April 1972 to celebrate the adding of the one-thousandth incunabulum to the Bryn Mawr Library, Privately printed by the Friends of the Bryn Mawr College Library, 1973
- Two Renaissance Book Hunters: The Letters of Poggius Bracciolini to Nicolaus De Niccolis. New York: Columbia, 1974
- "To hold the Renaissance in our hands." Text of address given at the annual general meeting of Friends of the Bodleian, 26 June 1973. Oxford: University Press, 1974
