= Salutati =

Salutati is a surname. Notable people with the surname include:

- Coluccio Salutati (1331–1406), Italian scholar and humanist
- Leonardo Salutati (died 1466), Italian Roman Catholic prelate
