= Renaissance Society of America =

Academic membership association

The Renaissance Society of America (RSA) is a nonprofit academic membership association founded in 1954 to promote study of the world during the Renaissance period, 1300–1700. It is a member of the American Council of Learned Societies. The RSA brings together scholars from many backgrounds in a wide variety of fields of scholarly inquiry. The RSA has thousands of members, including professors, instructors, and graduate students at universities, colleges, and secondary schools; curators and staff at museums, libraries, and other cultural institutions; independent scholars; writers and publishers; and many others interested in Renaissance studies. The Society's Annual Conference takes place in changing cities within North America and Europe.

With Cambridge University Press, the RSA publishes Renaissance Quarterly (ISSN 0034-4338), a peer-reviewed publication that began in 1948 as Renaissance News and was renamed beginning with volume 20 in 1967. In 1975, it subsumed a separate publication, Studies in the Renaissance, which was published by the University of Chicago Press from 1954 to 1974 (ISSN 0081-8658, vols. 1-21). The RSA published the Renaissance Society of America Reprint Text Series (RSTARTS) with the University of Toronto Press until 2012, and then the RSA Texts and Studies Series (RSA-TS) with Brill, from 2012 to 2023. The RSA also publishes an e-newsletter.

The Society offers a number of prizes and awards to promote and recognize the work of its members, including short-term research fellowships, scholarships for the Digital Humanities Summer Institute at the University of Victoria, the Paul Oskar Kristeller Lifetime Achievement Award, the Digital Innovation Award, the Phyllis Goodhart Gordan Prize for the best book published in Renaissance studies, and the William Nelson Prize for the best article in Renaissance Quarterly.
