= Erotemata =

1471 book on Greek grammar by Manuel Chrysoloras

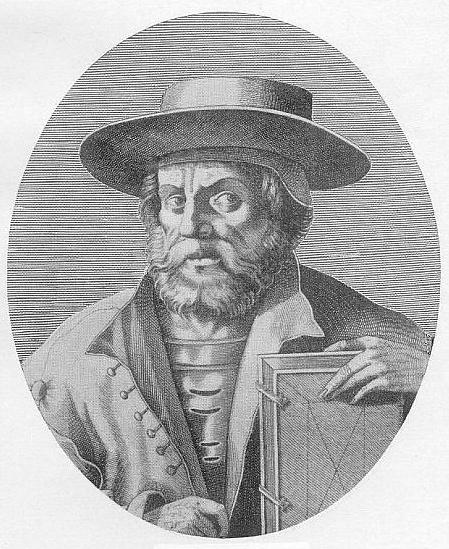
Manuel Chrysoloras

The Erotemata (Ἐρωτήματα) are the first printed basic Greek grammar in use in Western Europe, written by Manuel Chrysoloras who was a pioneer in spreading Greek literature in Western Europe.

Chrysoloras' Erotemata were likely first published in 1471 in Venice by Adam de Ambergau. It can be considered the first book ever printed in Greek, since it bears a Greek title-page and the text contains large parts in the language. It enjoyed immediate and considerable success in Italy, but also among later leading humanists, being studied by Thomas Linacre at Oxford and by Desiderius Erasmus at Cambridge.
