= Carlo Marsuppini =

Italian humanist

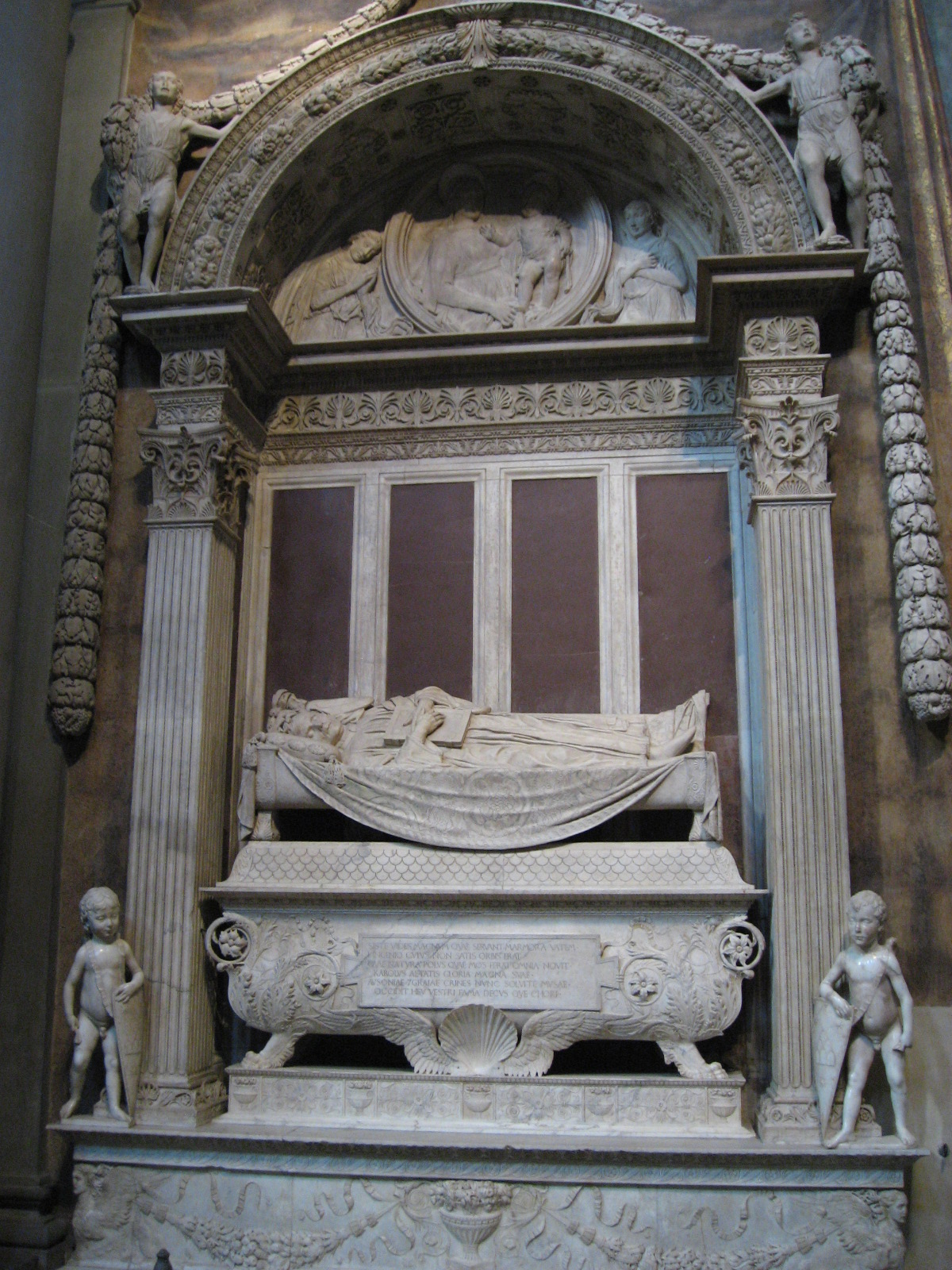
Tomb of Carlo Marsuppini in the Basilica Santa Croce in Florence.

Carlo Marsuppini (1399–1453), also known as Carlo Aretino and Carolus Arretinus, was an Italian Renaissance humanist and chancellor of the Florentine Republic.

== Biography ==
Marsuppini was born in Genoa into a family from Arezzo, but grew up and died in Florence. His father, Gregorio Marsuppini, had been governor of Genoa under Charles VI of France. Carlo was closely allied with the Medici family, and was a tutor to Lorenzo di Giovanni di Medici during the 1420s. Circa 1433, he loitered in brief exile in Verona with Lorenzo and Cosimo di Medici. In 1444, he followed Leonardo Bruni as chancellor of the Republic of Florence, with whom he shares the honor of a monument, designed by the sculptor Desiderio da Settignano, in the church of Santa Croce. Poggio Bracciolini became chancellor after Carlo's death.

Upon the death of his father Gregorio in 1444, Carlo commissioned from the painter Filippo Lippi an altarpiece for a memorial to be placed in the church of the Olivetan Convent at Arezzo. The altarpiece depicts the Coronation of the Virgin, with St. John and St. Benedict (called Marsuppini Coronation, now in Rome, Pinacoteca Vaticana.

He was a man of great culture, the author of letters and some poems. Among his works: a Consolatio of noteworthy Christian inspiration (which contrasts with his reputation for unbelief) upon the death of Piccarda de' Bueri (1368 to 1433), addressed to her sons Cosimo dei Medici and Lorenzo. Pope Nicholas V instructed him in 1452 to translate Homer's Iliad into Latin; however he died with much of the work incomplete. There also remain some "belles-lettres" in the Humanist genre, such as a translation of the Batracomyomachia, and solemn Latin poetry.

Two sons of Carlo Marsuppini, Cristoforo and Carlo (junior) appear as characters in the Commentarium in Convivium Platonis de Amore (“Commentary on Plato’s Symposium”) by Marsilio Ficino. Among Carlo's pupils was Giovanni Forteguerri of Pistoia.

Marsuppini was posthumously crowned poet laureate; his eulogy was read by Matteo Palmieri.
