= Niccolò de' Niccoli =

Italian humanist (1364–1437)

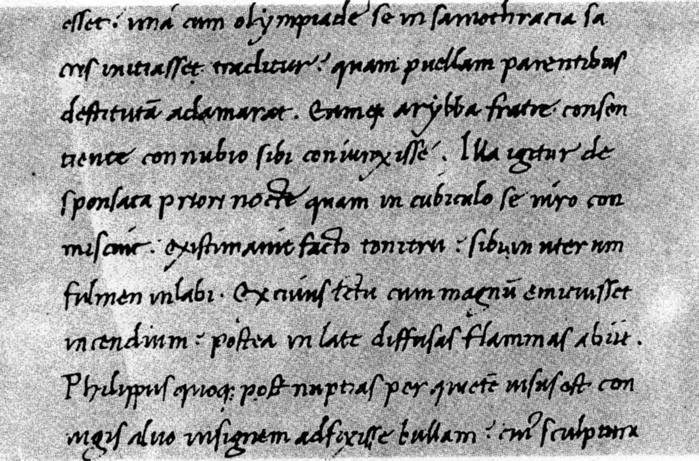
Sample of Niccoli's cursive script, which developed into Italic type

Niccolò de' Niccoli (1364 – 22 January 1437) was an Italian Renaissance humanist most known for inventing Italic script.

He was born and died in Florence, Italy, and was one of the chief figures in the company of learned men which gathered around the patronage of Cosimo de' Medici. Niccoli's chief services to classical literature consisted in his work as a copyist and collator of ancient manuscripts; he corrected the text, introduced divisions into chapters, and made tables of contents.

== Achievements ==
His lack of critical faculty was compensated by his excellent taste; in Greek (of which he knew very little) he had the assistance of Ambrogio Traversari. Many of the most valuable manuscripts in the Laurentian Library are by his hand, among them those of Lucretius and of twelve comedies of Plautus. The pursuit of ancient manuscripts was a dangerous and expensive task; agents working in the field at the time included Poggio Bracciolini. Thanks to the patronage of Cosimo de' Medici, Niccoli was able to build up his personal library of 800 manuscripts. He was generous with lending out his books since he had multiple copies of several Classical texts. This would be the basis of the library that Cosimo de' Medici built in San Marco.

Niccoli's private library was bettered only by that of Cosimo de' Medici who was the pioneer of the first Florentine public library which was the largest in Europe at that time. Niccoli also possessed a small but valuable collection of ancient works of art, coins and medals. He regarded himself as an infallible critic, and could not bear the slightest contradiction; his quarrels with Francesco Filelfo, Guarino da Verona and especially with Traversari created a great sensation in the learned world at the time.

His hypercritical spirit (according to his enemies, his ignorance of the language) prevented him from writing or speaking in Latin; his sole literary work was a short tract in Italian on Latin Orthography, which he withdrew from circulation after it had been violently attacked by Guarino. His fame as a Latin stylist was extensive, and many authors would submit to him their manuscripts prior to publication for correction; Leonardo Bruni called him the "censor of the Latin tongue".

He is also regarded as the inventor of the cursive script, known today as Italic or Cancelleresca. This came about from his enduring study of ancient manuscripts and the numerous copies he made. Niccoli decided he would vary his copied manuscripts by using tilted lettering and as a result later on, when Italian printers first used Italic type, they chose Niccoli's lettering style.

Niccoli was buried in the Basilica of Santo Spirito in Florence. He was extremely indebted prior to his death, after which Cosimo offered to cover all of his outstanding payments to debtors in exchange for control over his collection of 800 manuscripts valued at around 6,000 florins. He never married, preferring to fill his houses with manuscripts, coins, statuary, vases, and gems.

== See also ==
- Codex Ravennas 429
