= Chancellor of Florence =

Political position in the Republic of Florence

The Chancellor of Florence held the most important position in the bureaucracy of the Florentine Republic. Though the chancellor was not officially a member of the Republic's elected political government, unlike the gonfaloniere or the nine members of the signoria, the role was roughly equivalent to the head of the civil service in some countries today, and its holder could still wield considerable political influence. Holders included some of the most famous scholars, political thinkers and humanists of the Renaissance.

== Partial list ==
- Coluccio Salutati (1375 - 1406)
- Leonardo Bruni (1410-1411, 1427-1444)
- Carlo Marsuppini, known as Carlo Aretino, (1444 - 1453)
- Poggio Bracciolini (1453-1459)
- Benedetto Accolti (appointed 1459)
- Bartolomeo Scala (1465-1497)
- Niccolò Machiavelli (appointed 1498)
- Marcello Virgilio Adriani (February 1498)

== See also ==
- Chancellor
