= Guarino da Verona =

Italian classical scholar and Renaissance humanist (1374–1460)

Guarino
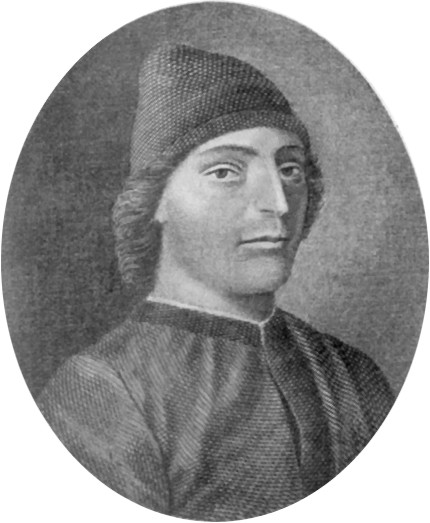
- Guarino da Verona
- Born: 1374; Verona
- Died: 14 December 1460 (aged 85–86); Ferrara
- Occupations: Interpreter, scholar, translator

Guarino Veronese or Guarino da Verona (1374 – 14 December 1460) was an Italian classical scholar, humanist, and translator of ancient Greek texts during the Renaissance. In the republics of Florence and Venice he studied under Manuel Chrysoloras (c. 1350–1415), renowned professor of Greek and ambassador of the Byzantine emperor Manuel II Palaiologos, the first scholar to hold such courses in medieval Italy.

== Biography ==
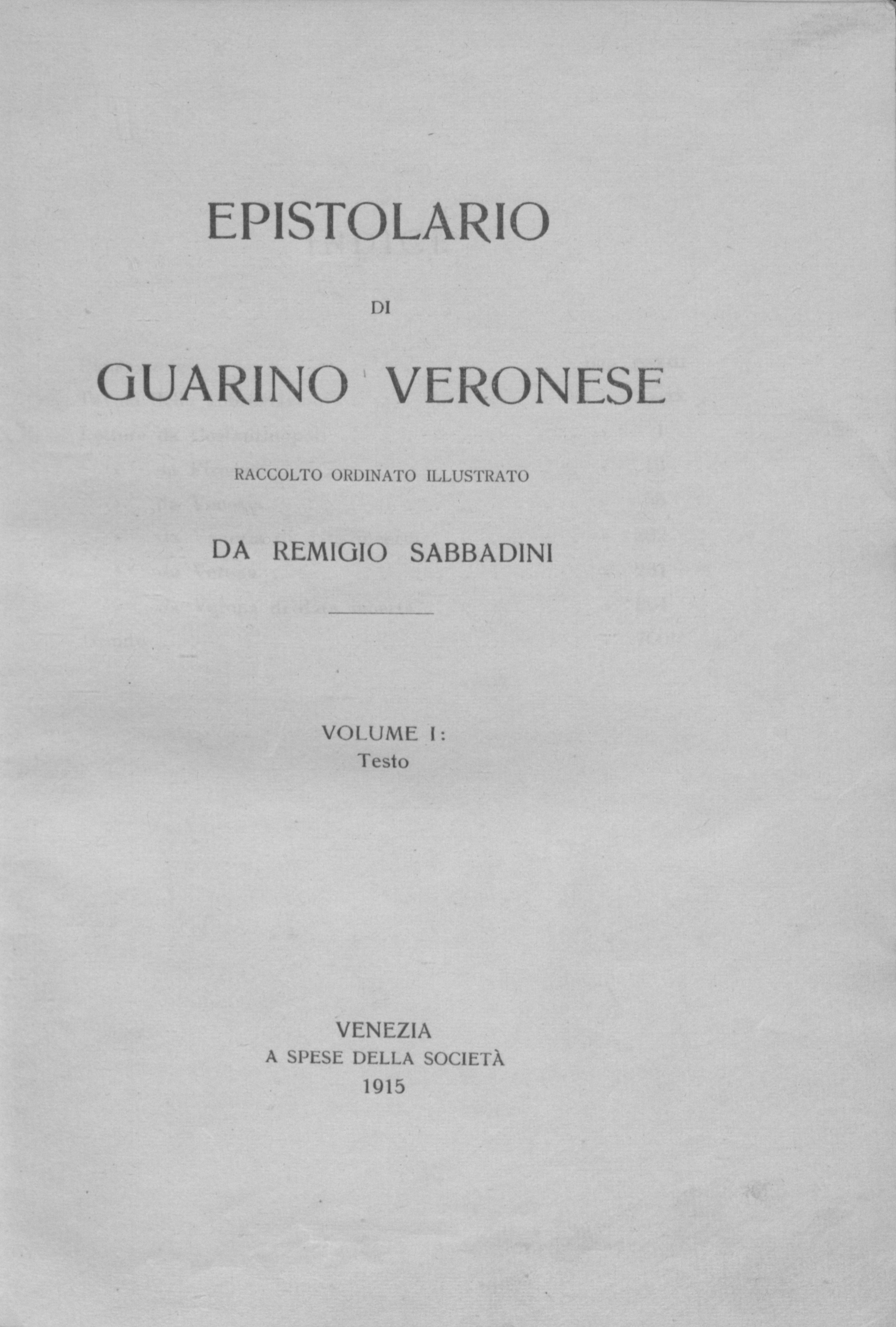
Guarino's epistolary (1915 edition)

He was born in Verona, medieval Italy, and later studied Greek language and literature in Constantinople, at the time capital of the Byzantine Empire, where for five years he was the pupil of the renowned Byzantine Greek scholar, Renaissance humanist, and professor Manuel Chrysoloras. When he set out to return home, he had with him two cases of precious manuscripts of ancient Greek texts which he had taken great pains to collect. It is said that the loss of one of these by shipwreck caused him such distress that his hair turned grey in a single night. On arriving back in Italy, he earned a living as a teacher of Greek, first in Verona and afterwards in Venice and Florence.

In 1436, he became a professor of Greek in Ferrara through the patronage of Leonello, Marquis of Este. His method of instruction was renowned and it attracted many students from Italy and the rest of medieval Europe as distant as the Kingdom of England. Many of them, notably the Italian Renaissance humanist and teacher Vittorino da Feltre, afterwards became well-known scholars and, as Vittorino would later, would support poor students from his funds. From 1438 on, he served as an interpreter for the Byzantine Greek participants at the ecumenical councils of Ferrara and Florence (1431–1449). He was particularly influenced by the Byzantine Greek scholar and philosopher Gemistus Pletho. He died in Ferrara in 1460.

His principal works are translations of Strabo and of some of the Lives of Plutarch, a compendium of the Greek grammar of Chrysoloras, and a series of commentaries on Persius, Martial, the Satires of Juvenal, and some of the writings of Aristotle and Cicero. The layout of the Studiolo of the Palazzo Belfiore is also attributed to him. He corresponded with the writer and humanist Isotta Nogarola.

== Sources ==
- Guarino da Verona at the Mathematics Genealogy Project
- Guarino da Verona from Catholic Encyclopedia
- Guarino da Verona in Ferrara
- Marsh, D. (1998). Lucian and the Latins: Humor and Humanism in the Early Renaissance. University of Michigan Press. p. 21. ISBN 9780472108466.
- Durant, Will. (1953). The Renaissance. The Story of Civilization. 5. New York: Simon & Schuster. p. 269.
- Omont, Henri: Portrait de Guarino de Veronese, Bulletin de la Société Nationale des Antiquaires de France, 1904, 323–326. https://archive.org/stream/bulletin1904sociuoft#page/n339/mode/2up (Book mentioned in this article, there is today: University of Minnesota, James Ford Bell Library, ms. 1460/f St.)
