= Coluccio Salutati =

Italian classical scholar and Renaissance humanist (1331–1406)

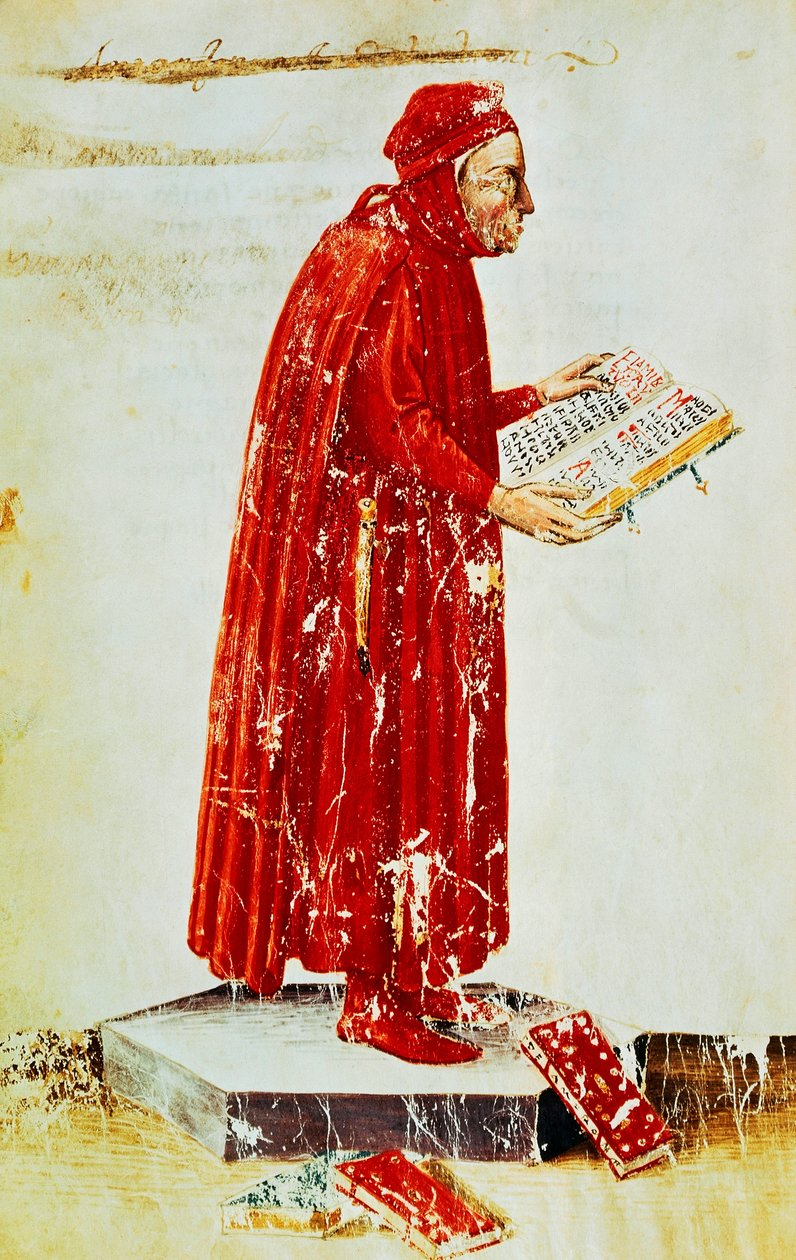
Coluccio Salutati

Coluccio Salutati (16 February 1331 (Note: Some scholars such as Augusto Campana, Mario Martelli (’’Schede per Coluccio Salutati’’, Interpres, IX, 1989, pp. 237-25), and others support the date of 1332 on the basis of letters in which Salutati writes of his own age. This date of birth is also accepted by Harvard University Press for Coluccio Salutati's works edition (The I Tatti Renaissance Library).) – 4 May 1406) was an Italian Renaissance humanist and notary, and one of the most important political and cultural leaders of Renaissance Florence; as chancellor of the Florentine Republic and its most prominent voice, he was effectively the permanent secretary of state in the generation before the rise of the powerful Medici family.

== Early career ==
Salutati was born in Stignano, a tiny commune near Buggiano (today's province of Pistoia, Tuscany). After studying in Bologna, where his father lived in exile after a Ghibelline coup in Buggiano, the family returned to Buggiano, which had become more securely part of the Republic of Florence. There he worked as a notary and pursued his literary studies, coming into contact with the Florentine humanists Boccaccio and Francesco Nelli. The refined and masterful classical Latin of his letters to Florentine scholars earned him the admiring nickname of "Ape of Cicero." In 1367 Coluccio was appointed chancellor of Todi in the Papal States. Papal secretary Francesco Bruni took Salutati with him to Rome from 1368 to 1370, as assistant in the Papal curia of Pope Urban V, who had recently returned from Avignon. In 1370, through his connections in the curia, he was made chancellor of the powerful Tuscan city of Lucca, a post he quickly lost in internecine struggles there.

== Chancellor of Florence ==
In 1374, Coluccio received an appointment in Florence, and the following year was appointed Chancellor of Florence, the most important position in the bureaucracy of the Florentine Republic. In his position, Salutati was responsible for the widely circulated official correspondence with other states, drafting confidential instructions to ambassadors, conducting diplomacy and negotiating treaties: "in its chancellor Florence had someone truly exceptional, endowed not only with legal knowledge, political cunning and diplomatic skill, but also with psychological penetration, a gift for public relations, and unusual literary skill." His abilities as a statesman were soon tested as Florence was immediately faced with war with the papacy. Salutati was charged with addressing Pope Gregory XI to assure him that Florence was still a loyal member of the Guelph party. Although he failed to prevent war with the papacy, Salutati soon became the most celebrated chancellor in all of Italy and a master of the formal letter. Florence's principal nemesis during his tenure, Gian Galeazzo Visconti, Duke of Milan, once remarked that one of Salutati's letters could "cause more damage than a thousand Florentine horsemen." During his life, Florence warred twice against its powerful northern rival, Giangaleazzo Visconti. His treatise De tyranno ("On the tyrant") published in 1400, has, most likely, its model in Visconti, although in it Salutati (despite being a republican) remains a supporter of the providential universal monarch already put forward by Dante. Occasionally his letters had unintended consequences. When he wrote to the people of Ancona in 1376, inciting them, in the name of their freedom, to revolt against the governor imposed by the pope, he called to mind the evils Italy had suffered on behalf of the French. Word of his nasty tone got to the King of France, which prompted a most conciliatory letter from Salutati, assuring the King that he meant no harm and that Florence would always be a friend to France.

In testimony to his service as chancellor, the city of Florence paid 250 florins for his funeral in 1406.

== Cultural achievements ==
Coluccio's cultural achievements are perhaps even greater than his political ones. A skilled writer and orator, Coluccio drew heavily upon the classical tradition and developed a powerful prose style based on the Latin of Virgil and Cicero: "I have always believed," Salutati wrote, "I must imitate antiquity not simply to reproduce it, but in order to produce something new". In this sense, his own view of humanism was broader-based than the antiquarianism of the generation of humanists he fostered.

An admiring correspondent of Petrarch, he spent much of his salary on amassing a collection of 800 books, slightly less than his contemporary Niccolò de' Niccoli. He also pursued classical manuscripts, making a number of important discoveries, the most important being Cicero's lost Letters to his Friends (Epistulae ad Familiares), which showed Cicero as a defender of republican liberty. Coluccio also did important studies of history, tying Florence's origin not to the Roman Empire but to the Roman Republic.

He promoted the work of younger humanists such as Gian Francesco Poggio Bracciolini, Niccolò de' Niccoli, Leonardo Bruni and Pier Paolo Vergerio.

He also brought the Byzantine scholar Manuel Chrysoloras to Florence in 1397 to teach one of the first courses in Greek since the end of the Roman Empire. After Boethius, few Westerners spoke or read Greek. Many ancient Greek works of science and philosophy were not available in Latin translation. By Salutati's time, a few Latin texts of Aristotle had arrived in Europe via Muslim Spain and Sicily. These texts, however, had been translated from Arabic, rather than directly from the Greek. By bringing Chrysoloras to Florence, Salutati made it possible for a select group of scholars (including Bruni and Vergerio) to read Aristotle and Plato in the original ancient Greek.

== Works ==
Composed of hundreds of letters, Coluccio's Epistolary deals with a wide array of subjects. Structurally, the collection is divided into two strands: private letters, addressed to friends and acquaintances, and public letters, written in the name of the Republic of Florence. Stylistically, Coluccio's epistolary stands out for its departure from the medieval letter-writing style, which was dense with the rhetoric of the ars dictandi, making way instead for a tone of cordial and stoic serenity inspired by Cicero's Letters to Friends (Epistulae ad familiares) and the lexical repertoire of other classical authors, thus producing what has been defined as a form of mixed Latin.

Among his more explicitly philosophical writings, the De seculo et religione is a key text in which Salutati defends the compatibility of active civic life with Christian religious devotion. Against the view that moral life necessitated withdrawal from worldly affairs, he argued that public engagement, when guided by virtue, was not only permissible but ennobling. A related concern animates his De tyranno, a political treatise that denounces despotism and upholds liberty as a central civic and moral value. Drawing on classical sources and Christian ethics alike, Salutati here anticipates the political philosophy of later Renaissance republicans.

His unfinished De laboribus Herculis represents an ambitious allegorical-philosophical project interpreting the mythological labours of Hercules as symbolic of the soul's journey toward virtue. Inspired by Stoic and Neoplatonic moral traditions, this treatise reflects his desire to reconcile classical moral philosophy with Christian thought, portraying Hercules not simply as a hero of brute strength, but as a paradigm of ethical struggle and spiritual progress.

In his Tractatus ex epistola ad Lucilium prima, Salutati offers a meditation on time, virtue, and human failure, drawing inspiration from the first of Seneca's Epistulae ad Lucilium. This moral-philosophical treatise explores how much of human life is lost through vice, idleness, or misplaced effort, and exemplifies Salutati's concern with the ethical use of time and the cultivation of the moral life in a civic context.

De fato et fortuna (On Fate and Fortune) (1396–1397) is divided into five tractates; the treatise sets forth the argument of free will and the relationship that exists between it and the events that can hinder its designs. Salutati heavily relies on Augustine's De civitate Dei, which he regards as foundational. He develops the doctrine of coefficiency, proposing that divine providence and free will operate collaboratively rather than being mutually exclusive. Expounding upon Augustine's concept of fortuitous causes, Salutati argues that fortune exists but is ultimately subordinate to God's will. Moreover, Augustine's rejection of astrological determinism influences Salutati's critique of astrologers like Cecco d'Ascoli and geomancers. De fato et fortuna represents Salutati's synthesis of Augustinian theology with his humanist concerns, offering a nuanced discussion of fate, fortune, and free will that resonates with the political and ethical challenges of his era.

Salutati also engaged in polemics, most notably in his Invectivae, where he employed his rhetorical skill in defence of Florence against external and ecclesiastical adversaries, including the Antipope Clement VII. These works, deeply political yet stylistically humanist, reflect his belief in the power of eloquence to uphold republican liberty and to resist corruption. Other works include De verecundia (1390) and De nobilitate legum et medicine (1399).
