= Leonardo Bruni =

Italian humanist historian (c. 1370–1444)

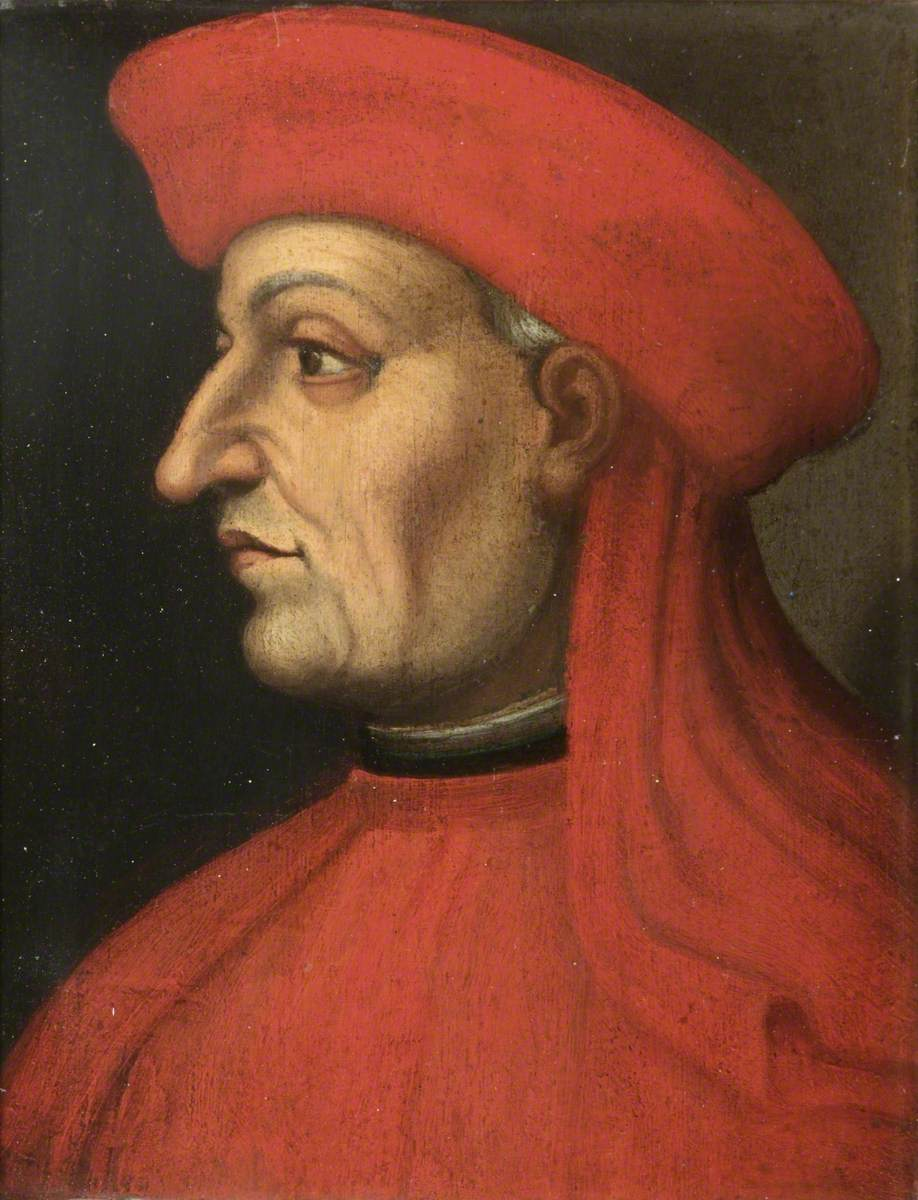
Bruni

Leonardo Bruni (Note: /ˈbruːni/; Italian: [ˈbruːni]) or Leonardo Aretino (c. 1370 – 9 March 1444) was an Italian humanist, historian and statesman, often recognized as the most important humanist historian of the early Renaissance. He has been called the first modern historian. He was the earliest person to write using the three-period view of history: Antiquity, Middle Ages, and Modern. The dates Bruni used to define the periods are not exactly what modern historians use today, but he laid the conceptual groundwork for a tripartite division of history.

== Biography ==
Leonardo Bruni was born in Arezzo, Tuscany circa 1370. Bruni was the pupil of political and cultural leader Coluccio Salutati, whom he succeeded as Chancellor of Florence, and under whose tutelage he developed his ideation of civic humanism. He also served as apostolic secretary to four popes (1405–1414). Bruni's years as chancellor, 1410 to 1411 and again from 1427 to his death in 1444, were plagued by warfare. Though he occupied one of the highest political offices, Bruni was relatively powerless compared to the Albizzi and Medici families. Historian Arthur Field has identified Bruni as an apparent plotter against Cosimo de' Medici in 1437 (see below). Bruni died in 1444 in Florence and was succeeded in office by Carlo Marsuppini.

== Significance ==
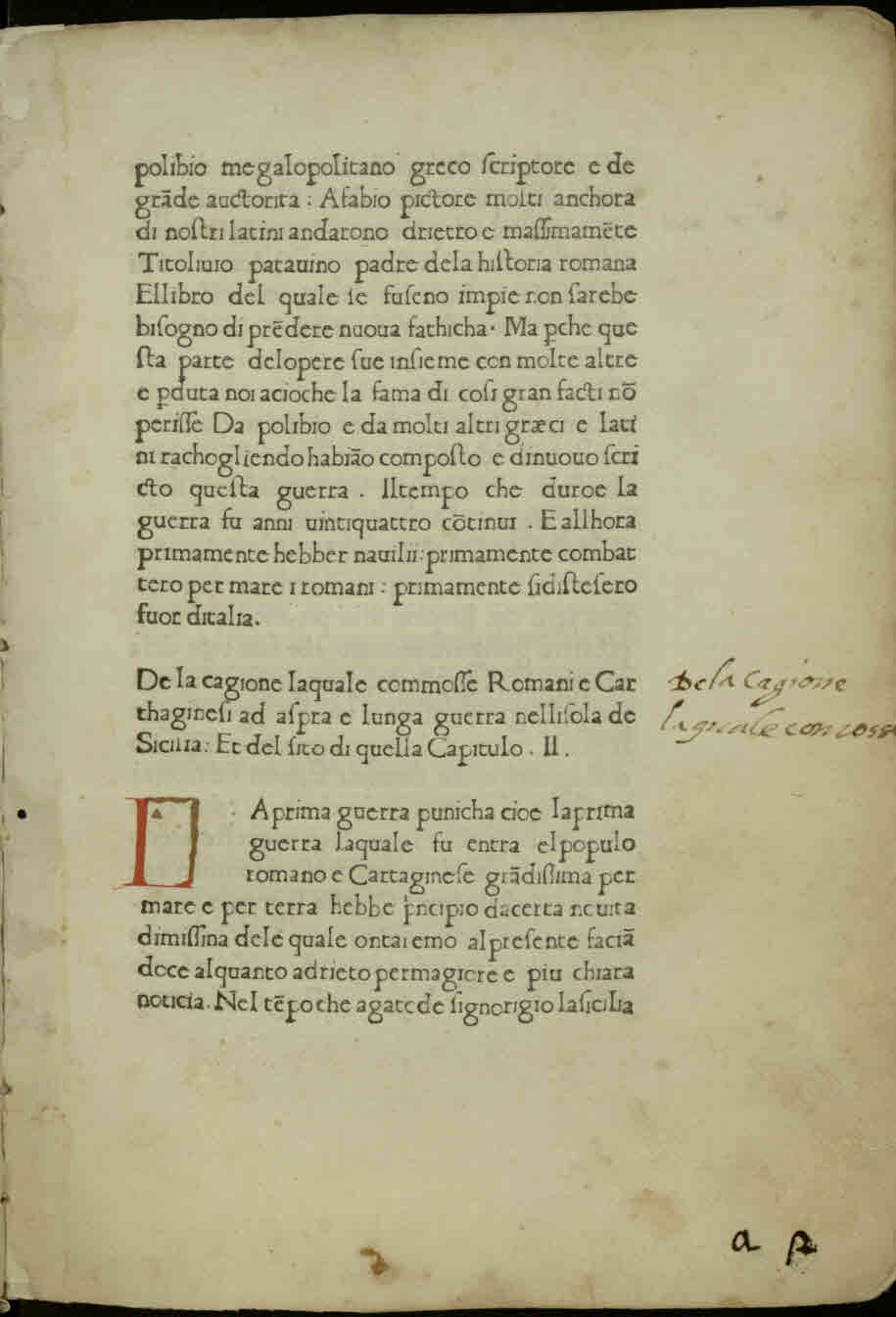
De primo bello punico, 1471

Bruni's most notable work is Historiarum Florentini populi libri XII (History of the Florentine People, 12 Books), which has been called the first modern history book. While it probably was not Bruni's intention to secularise history, the three-period view of history is unquestionably secular, and so Bruni has been called the first modern historian. The foundation of Bruni's conception can be found with Petrarch, who distinguished the classical period from later cultural decline, or tenebrae (literally "darkness"). Bruni argued that Italy had revived in recent centuries and could therefore be described as entering a new age.

One of Bruni's most famous works is New Cicero, a biography of the Roman statesman Cicero. He was also the author of biographies in Italian of Dante and Petrarch. It was Bruni who used the phrase studia humanitatis, meaning the study of human endeavours, as distinct from those of theology and metaphysics, the source of the term humanists.

As a humanist, Bruni was essential in translating into Latin many works of Greek philosophy and history, such as Aristotle and Procopius. Bruni's translations of Aristotle's Politics and Nicomachean Ethics, as well as the pseudo-Aristotelian Economics, were widely distributed in manuscript and in print. His use of Aelius Aristides' Panathenicus (Panegyric to Athens) to buttress his republican theses in the Panegyric to the City of Florence (c. 1401) was instrumental in bringing the Greek historian to the attention of Renaissance political philosophers (see Hans Baron's The Crisis of the Early Italian Renaissance for details). He also wrote a short treatise in Greek on the Florentine constitution.

Bruni was one of the first Humanists to confront Plato's discussion of same-sex relationships.

Bruni died in Florence in 1444, and is buried in a wall tomb by Bernardo Rossellino in the Basilica of Santa Croce, Florence.

== Works ==
=== Latin text and English translation ===
- Hankins, James, ed. (2001). History of the Florentine People. Vol. 1. Translated by Hankins, James. Cambridge, MA, US: Harvard University Press. ISBN 978-0-674-00506-8. OCLC 885793795 – via Internet Archive.
- Hankins, James, ed. (2004). History of the Florentine People. Vol. 2. Translated by Hankins, James. Cambridge, MA, US: Harvard University Press. ISBN 978-0-674-01066-6. OCLC 886418411 – via Internet Archive.
- Hankins, James, ed. (2007). History of the Florentine People. Vol. 3. Translated by Hankins, James. Cambridge, MA, US: Harvard University Press. ISBN 978-0-674-01682-8. OCLC 316781359 – via Internet Archive.

=== Latin texts online ===
- An vulgus et literati eodem modo per Terentii Tullique tempora Romae locuti sint
- Calphurnia et Gurgulia
- De Bello Gallico Adversus Gothos
- Bruni, Leonardo (1610) [1442]. Historiarum Florentinarum libri XII : quibus accesserunt quorundam suo tempore in Italia gestorum & de rebus Græcis commentarii (in Latin). Strassburg: Lazarus Zetzner. OCLC 288009927. Digitized from a copy at the John Adams Library.
- De studijs et litteris ad illustem dominam baptistam de malatesta tractatulus. Leipzig 1496.
- Epistola ad Baptistam de Malatestis.
- De interpretatione recta on Wikisource
- "Lewis E 54 De primo bello punico (On the first Punic War)". University of Pennsylvania OPenn.

=== German texts online ===
- De duobus amantibus Guiscardo et Sigismunda. Ulm, Johann Zainer, ca. 1476–1477. From the Rare Book and Special Collections Division at the Library of Congress
