= Apparition of Christ to the Virgin =

Painting by Filippino Lippi

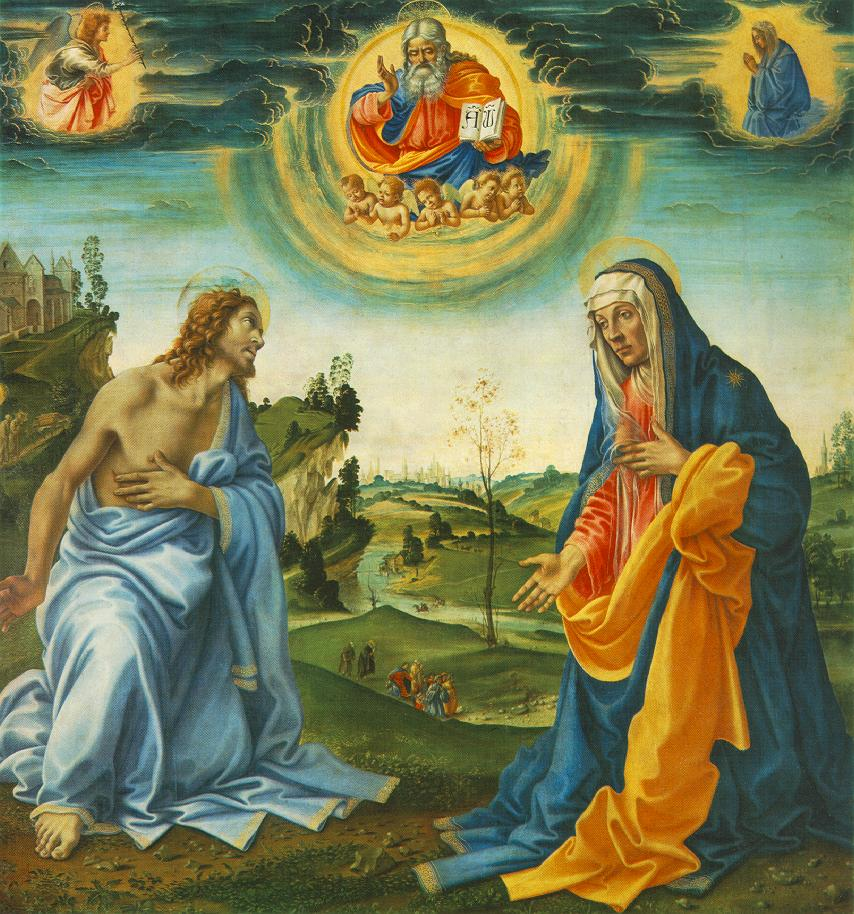
- Artist: Filippino Lippi
- Year: c. 1493
- Medium: Oil on panel
- Dimensions: 156.1 cm × 146.7 cm (61.5 in × 57.8 in)
- Location: Alte Pinakothek, Munich

The Apparition of Christ to the Virgin is a painting by the Italian Renaissance master Filippino Lippi, executed around 1493 and now housed in the Alte Pinakothek of Munich, Germany.

The work dates to around to the period after Lippi's return to Florence after his works in the Carafa Chapel at Rome. It is perhaps to be identified with the panel mentioned by the Renaissance art historian Giorgio Vasari in the church of San Francesco al Palco of Prato. In the 19th century, Ludwig I of Bavaria acquired the paintings, which later, together with the other royal collections, was included in the Alte Pinakothek.

== Description ==
The painting portrays Mary kneeling under the God, shown in a golden disc amongst the clouds in the sky. She is flanked by the apparitions of the Angel of the Annunciation and the Virgin Mary. The unusual iconography was perhaps a precise request of the commissioners, who would be also referenced by the monastery on the hill at the left.

Mary, according to the preachings by Girolamo Savonarola which were popular in Florence at the time, is aged and with a dramatic expression on her face. Her larger figure is perhaps connected to the particular worship she received in the original location of the painting.

The landscape in the background is depicted using aerial perspective, with echoes of the early Netherlandish paintings through Italian predecessors of Filippino, including his father Filippo Lippi. There are some small characters such as a few monks, depicted on a river view (perhaps the Bisenzio near Florence) commanded by rocky formations on the right. Far away is a misty city, identifiable most likely with Florence due to the presence of a large dome resembling that of Santa Maria del Fiore.

The panel has a predella with Christ Hold by an Angel and Six Saints.

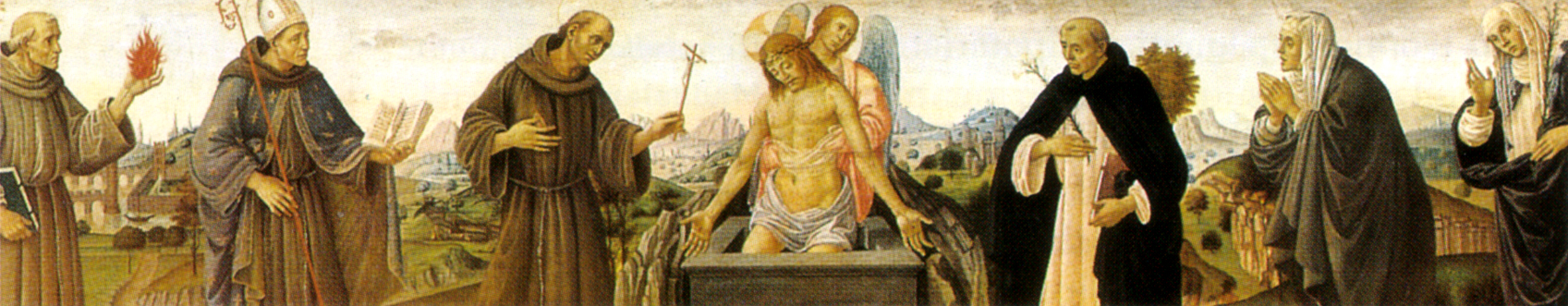
The predella.

== Sources ==
- Cosmo, Giulia (2001). Filippino Lippi. Florence: Giunti. ISBN 88-09-02031-6.
