= Raffaellino del Garbo =

Italian painter

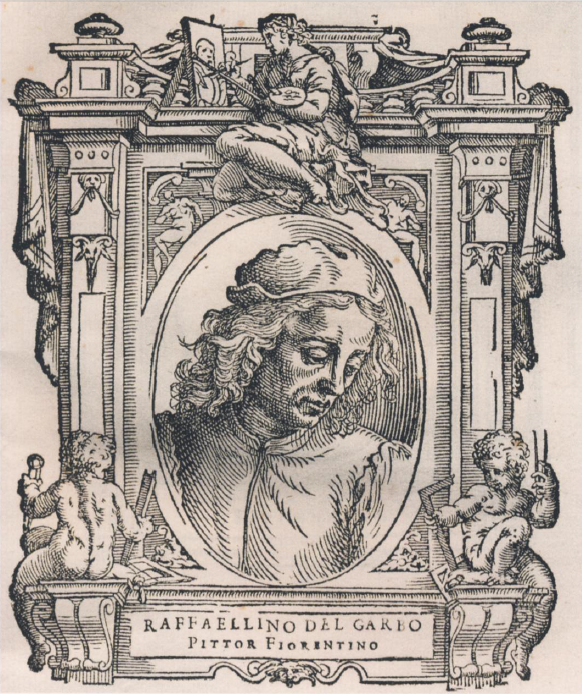
- Cristoforo Coriolano's portrait of Raffaellino del Garbo, from the 1568 edition of Vasari's Vite
- Born: Raffaello di Bartolomeo dei Carli; 1466; Florence, Italy
- Died: ca. 1527; Florence, Italy
- Education: Filippino Lippi
- Known for: Painting

Raffaellino del Garbo (1466–1527) was a Florentine painter of the early Renaissance.

== Biography ==
His real name was Raffaello di Bartolomeo dei Carli. He was also known as Raffaello Capponi after his adoptive family. The appellation "del Garbo" comes from the location of his workshop on the street formerly known as the via del Garbo, now the via della Condotta. He was also called Raffaelle de' Carli and signed at least one altarpiece, in situ in the church of Santa Maria degli Angeli in Valli, Siena, as "Raffaello de Florentia" [i.e. Raphael of Florence]. He was a pupil of Filippino Lippi, with whom he remained until 1490, if not later. He accompanied Filippino to Rome, where, according to Vasari, he painted the anteroom of the chapel of St. Thomas Aquinas (Carafa Chapel) in the church of Santa Maria sopra Minerva.

Vasari thought the artist died at Florence in 1524, but he was certainly alive in 1527, when he was described as fit for military duty. He probably succumbed to the plague that ravaged Florence between 1527 and 1528.

His pupils reportedly included Andrea del Sarto and the young Bronzino.

== Works ==
Raffaellino produced altarpieces, frescoes and small scale religious works for domestic interiors. His activity was focused on Florence and its environs. Four extant altarpieces are signed and dated:

- Madonna and Child with Saints Francis, Zenobius and Two Donors, dated 1500, once at the Ospedale di Santa Maria Nuova, Florence, and now at the Museo del Cenacolo di San Salvi, Florence.
- Mass of Saint Gregory, dated 1501, originally in the Antinori chapel, Santo Spirito, Florence, and now at the Ringling Museum of Art, Sarasota, Florida.
- Madonna and Child with Two Angels, Saints Jerome and Bartholomew, dated 1502, originally in the Corsini chapel, Santo Spirito, Florence, and now at the Palace of the Legion of Honor, San Francisco, California.
- Madonna and Child in Glory with Saints Bernardo degli Uberti, Mary Magdalen, John the Baptist and a Bishop Saint, dated 1502, in its original location over the high altar of Santa Maria degli Angeli in Valli, Siena.

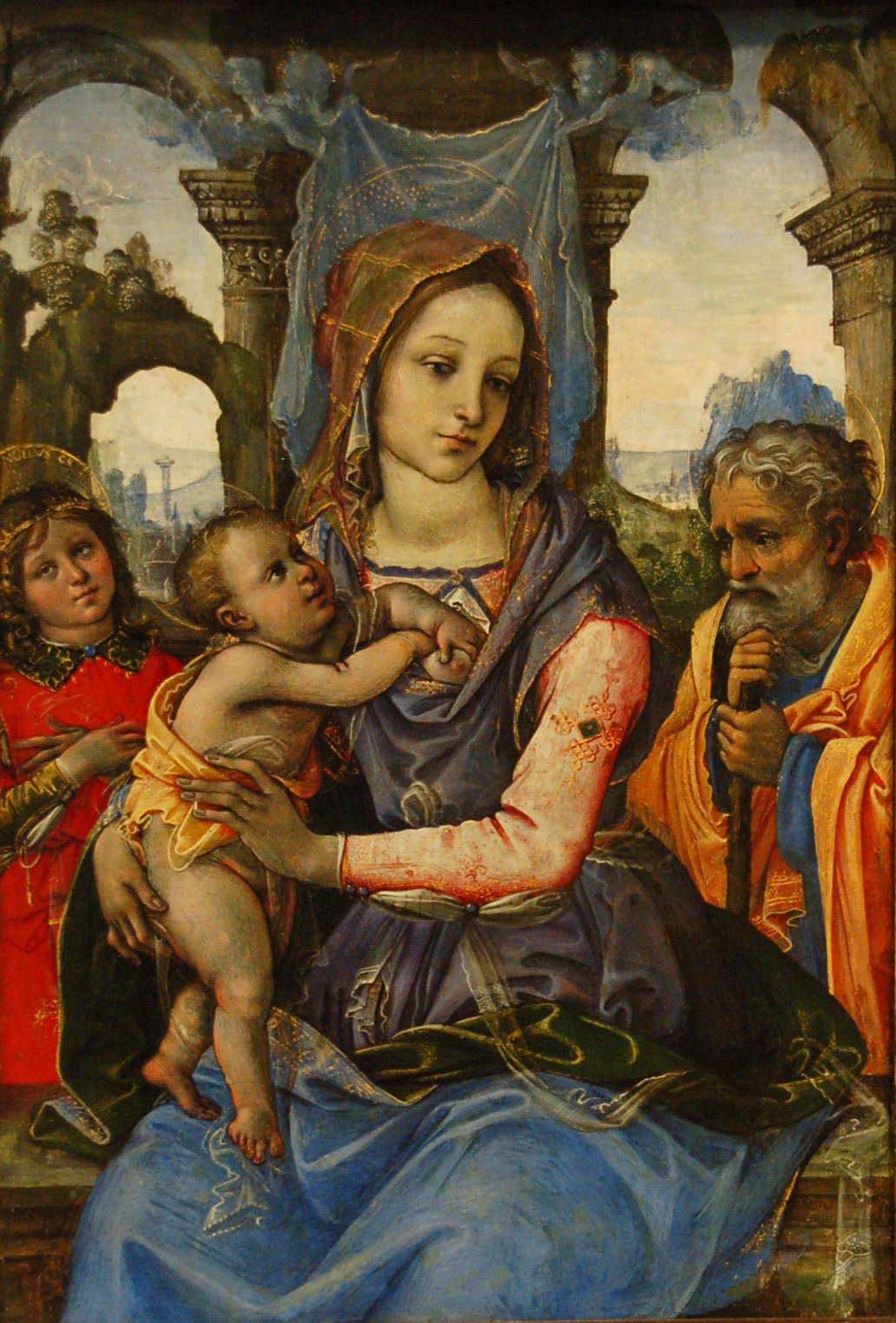
Madonna and Child with saint Joseph and an Angel

Other altarpieces include the Pietà of about 1497, originally in the Nasi chapel in Santo Spirito, Florence, and now at the Alte Pinakothek in Munich; the Resurrection of about 1498 for the church of the Benedictine monastery of Monte Oliveto, Florence, now in that city's Galleria dell'Accademia; and the Madonna and Child with Saints John the Evangelist, Lawrence, Stephen and Bernard for the Segni chapel in Santo Spirito, which remains in its original location, in its original frame, and is inscribed with the date of 1505. In 1503 he frescoed the Miracle of the Loaves in the refectory of the Florentine convent of the Cestello (now called Santa Maria Maddalena dei Pazzi), now detached and displayed alongside its sinopia (underdrawing) in the church of Sant'Antonino a Bellariva in the outskirts of Florence. Raffaellino's large Coronation of the Virgin, painted in 1511 for the high altar of San Salvi, Florence, where it was described by Vasari, is now at the Musée du Petit Palais, Avignon.

Religious works

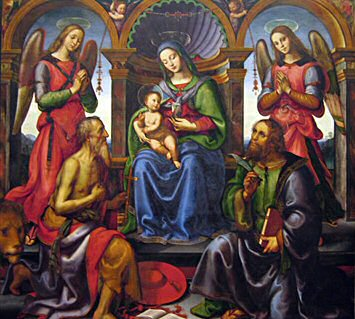
Madonna Enthroned with Saints and Angels, 1502, oil on poplar panel, 214.6 × 198.1 cm, Fine Arts Museums of San Francisco, Gift of the Samuel H. Kress Foundation

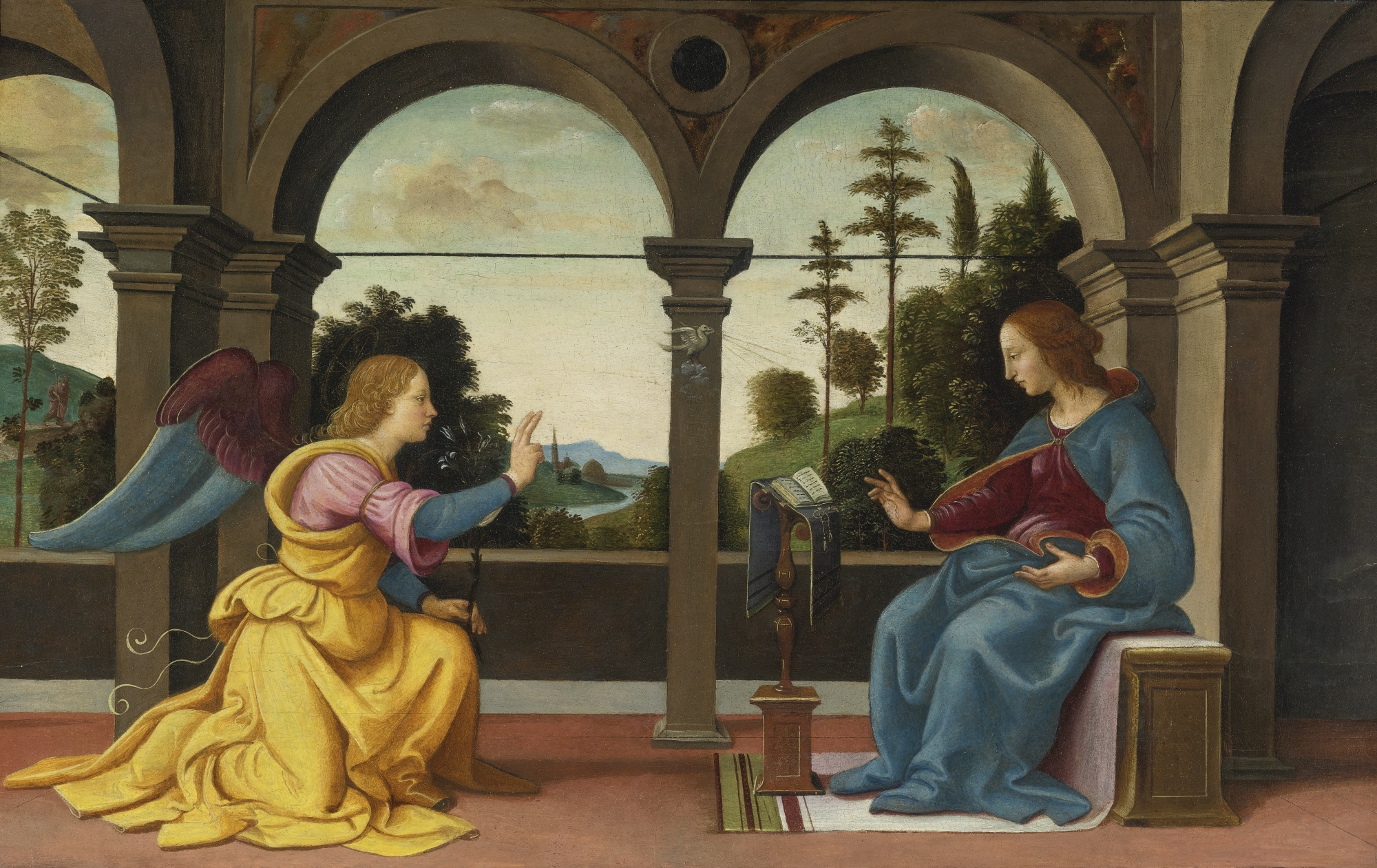
Annunciation, ca 1510, private collection

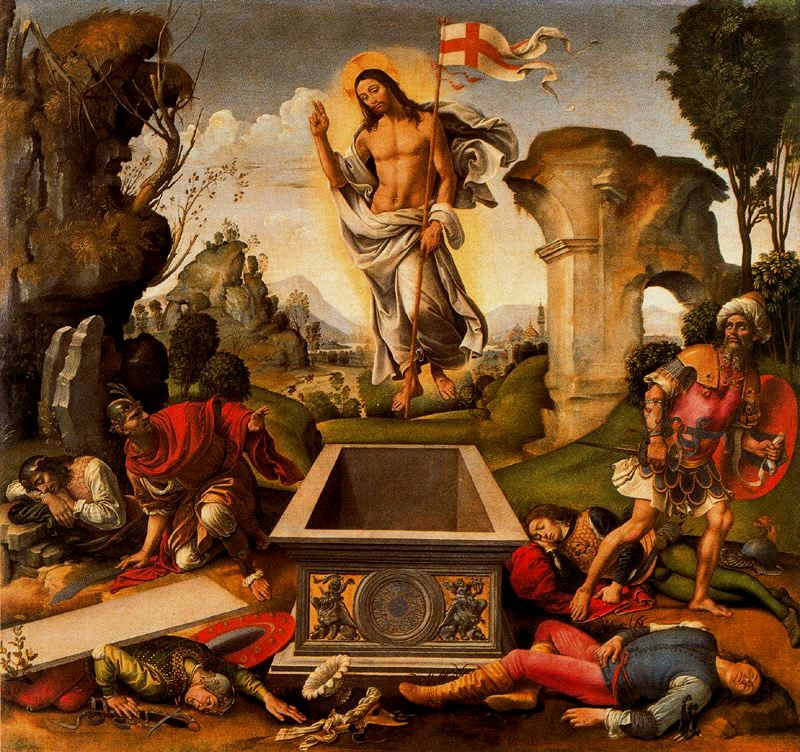
Resurrection, ca 1498, Galleria dell'Accademia, Florence
Portraits

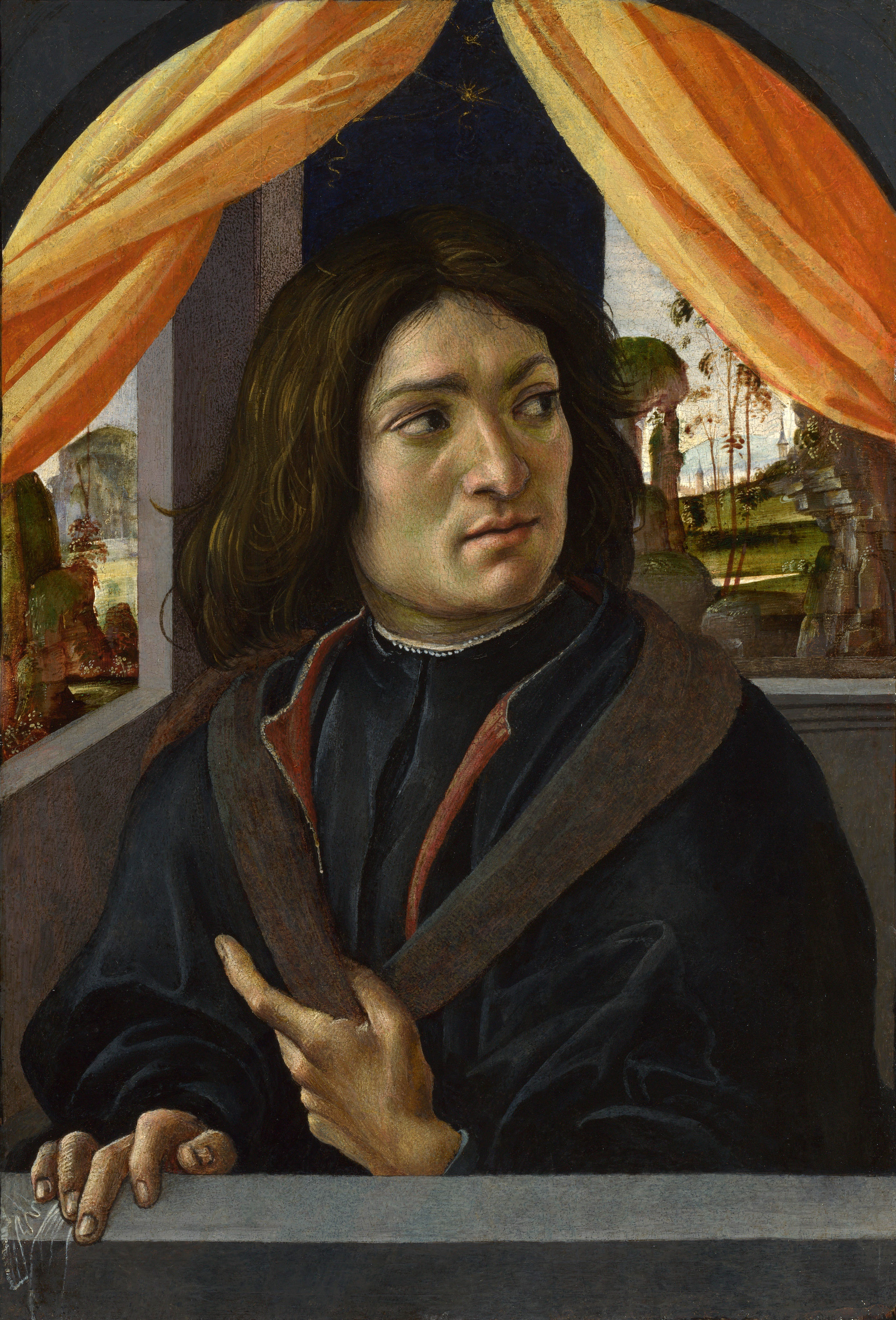
Portrait of a man, ca 1495, National Gallery, London

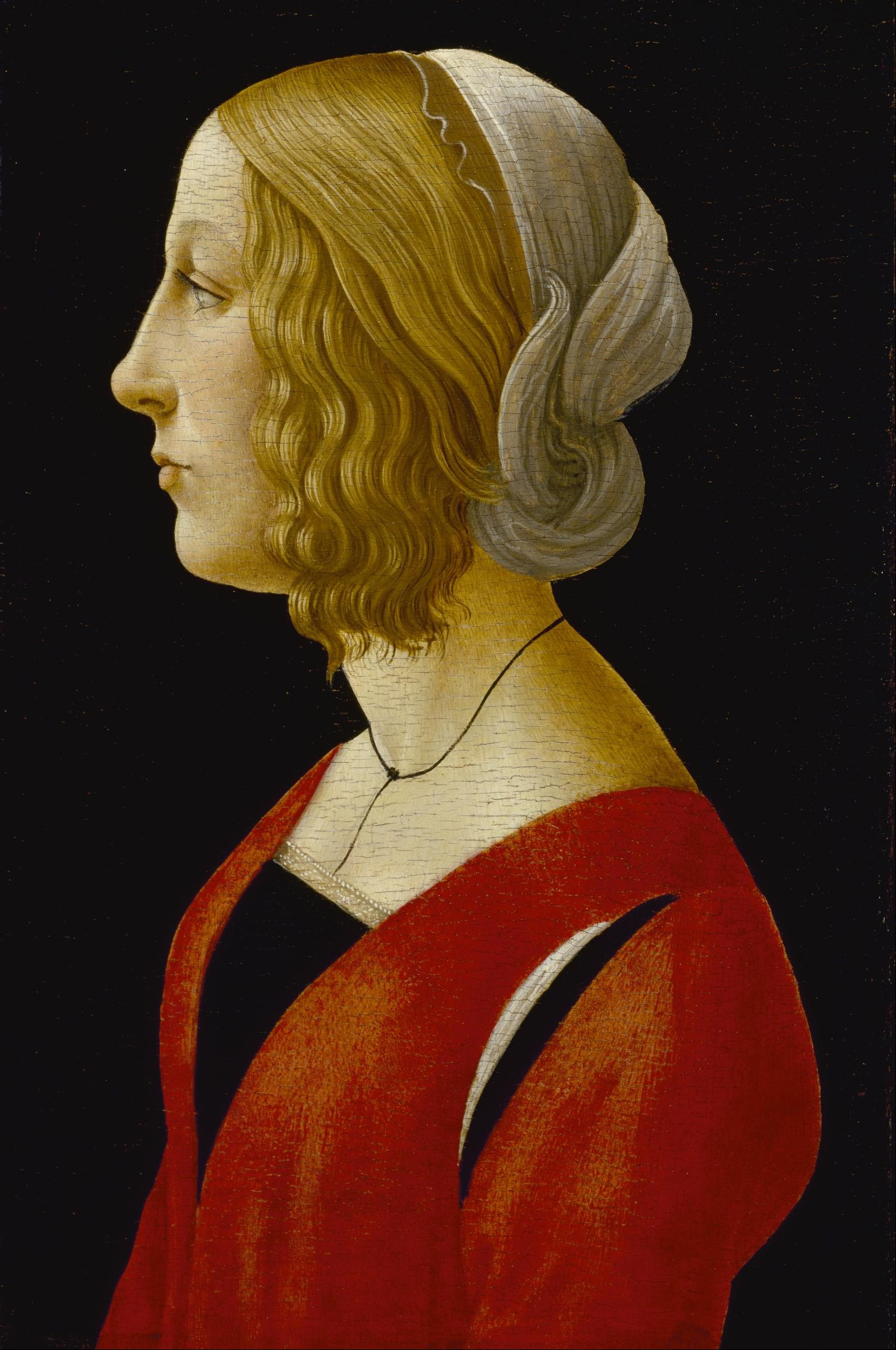
Bust of a Young Woman, 1490s, Museum of Fine Arts, Houston
