= San Frediano =

San Frediano ("Saint Fridianus") is the name of an early Christian Irish pilgrim, who became bishop of Lucca, Tuscany, Italy. Named after him are:

- Basilica di San Frediano, Lucca
- Church of San Frediano, Pisa
- Church of San Frediano in Cestello, in Florence
- Porta San Frediano, Florence, gate in the Southeastern sector of the former walls around the city of Florence
- San Frediano a Settimo, a village in the province of Pisa
