= Allegory (Filippino Lippi) =

Painting attributed to Ridolfo Ghirlandaio

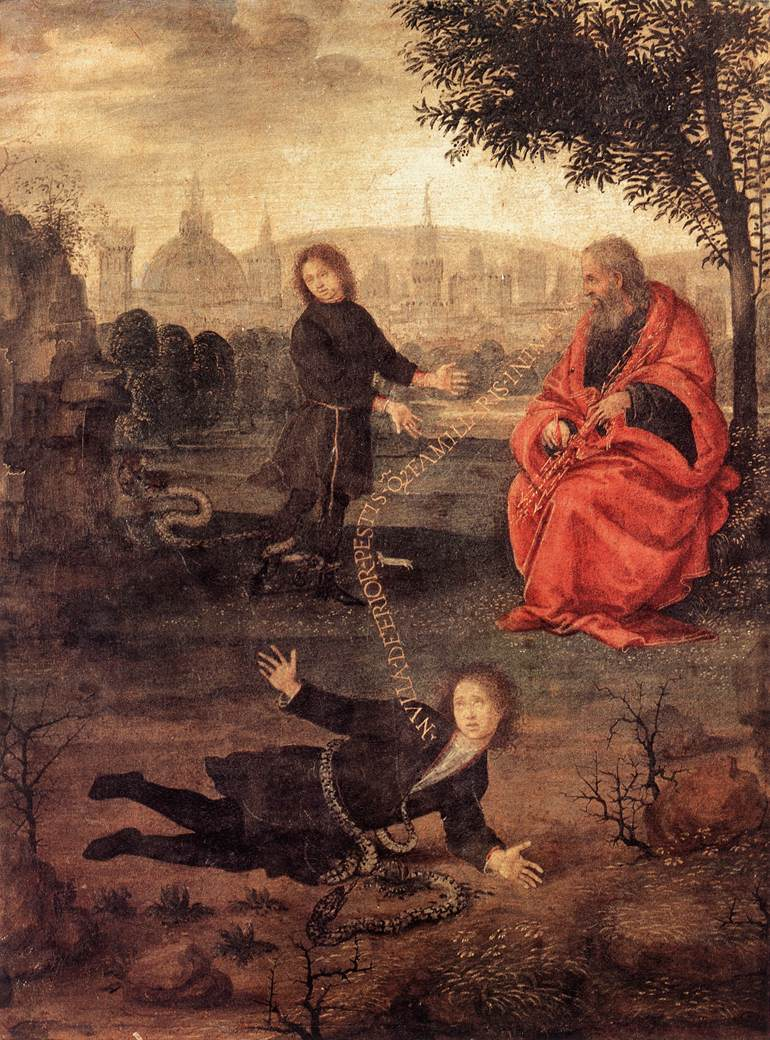
- Artist: Ridolfo del Ghirlandaio
- Year: c. 1498
- Type: Oil
- Dimensions: 30 cm × 23 cm (12 in × 9.1 in)
- Location: Uffizi Gallery; Florence

Allegory is a painting mostly attributed to Ridolfo del Ghirlandaio. In the past it was usually attributed to the Italian Renaissance master Filippino Lippi, executed around 1498. It is now in the Uffizi Gallery of Florence. The work had been variously assigned, to Leonardo da Vinci, one of the Ghirlandaio family, or an unknown 15th century painter.

== Description ==
The scene is set on a hill, with Florence in the background. It features a man, whose legs are tied by a serpent, who closes to an aged one, dressing in red and sitting near a tree. The latter is holding several lightnings. Next to the walking man is a small stoat, a symbol of purity.

The same character, with the serpent getting out from his jacket and looking at him, has fallen in the foreground. An inscription gets out from his mouth, saying NULLA DETERIOR PESTIS QUAM FAMILIARIS INIMICUS ("Nothing is more dangerous than a family's enemy") and going towards the old man.

The subject has been variously interpreted: as the story of Laocoön, an allegory of two enemy brothers, or, more likely, of the civil wars that followed the fall of Girolamo Savonarola in Florence. The last version is supported by the fact that, in Renaissance art, the presence of a well defined city (Florence in this case) had always a meaning. The man dressing in red would be God or Jupiter; in the latter case, the man nearing him would be nearing paganism, the serpent being a symbol of the Devil making him stumble later.
