= Annunciation with Saints John the Baptist and Andrew =

Painting by Filippino Lippi

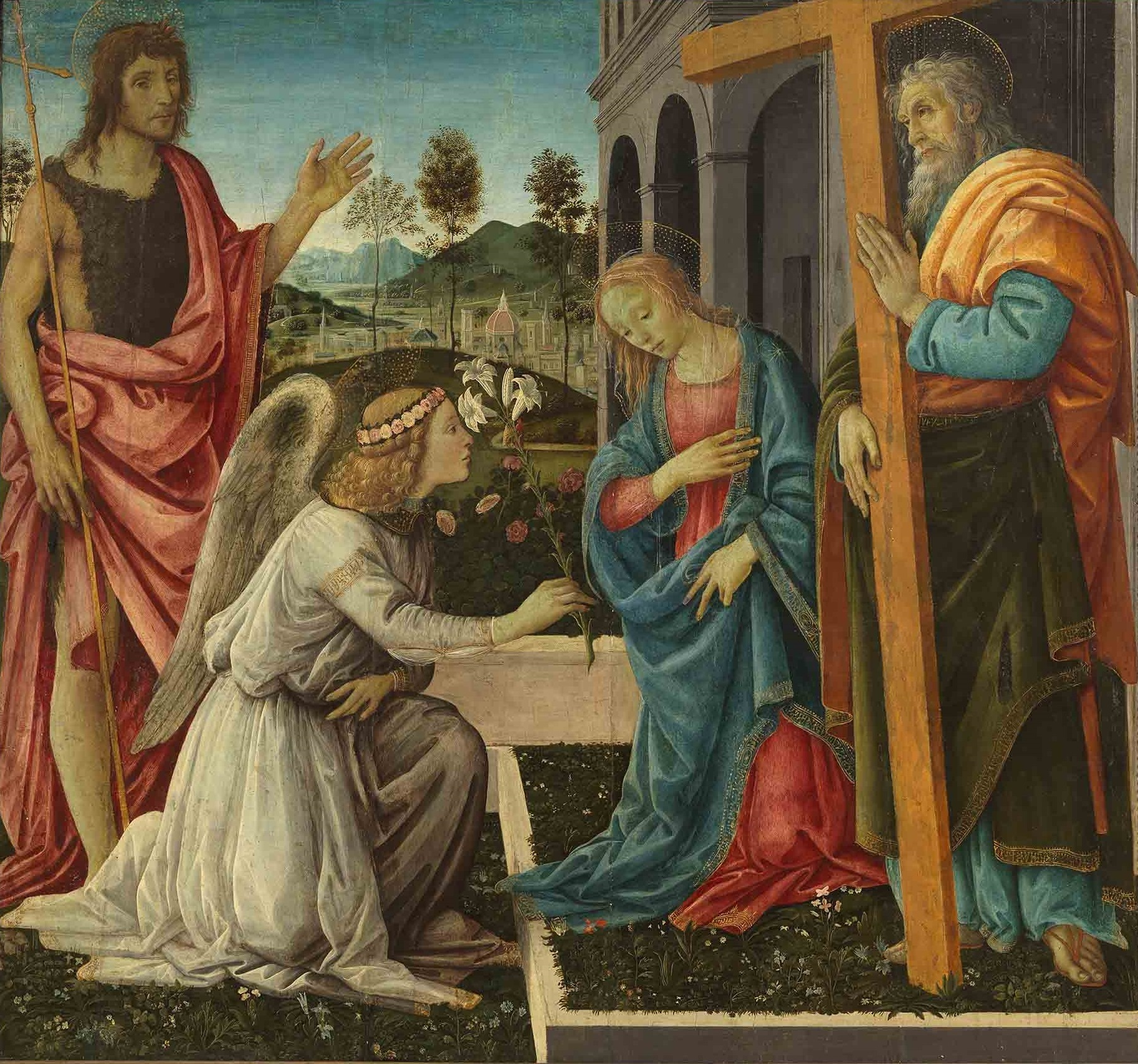
- Artist: Filippino Lippi
- Year: c. 1485
- Medium: Oil on panel
- Dimensions: 114 cm × 122 cm (45 in × 48 in)
- Location: National Museum of Capodimonte, Naples

The Annunciation with Saints John the Baptist and Andrew is an oil painting on panel of c. 1485 by Filippino Lippi. An early work by the artist, it shows an Annunciation scene between John the Baptist (on the left), the patron saint of Florence, and Andrew (on the right, with his diagonal cross).

In the background is a view of Florence, meaning that the work may have been commissioned for an individual or institution in the city; the view includes the Duomo, the Campanile, the Bargello and the Badia. The painting is influenced by several other artists, including Lippi's father Filippo (who often painted Annunciations) and Filippino's colleague Botticelli. The detailed and naturalistic flora in the foreground and background is typical of late-15th-century Florentine art, influenced by new works from the Low Countries and studies by Leonardo da Vinci.

The panel was confiscated from San Luigi dei Francesi in Rome by French Republican troops, and in 1801 it entered the Galleria Francavilla in Naples. At that time it was attributed to Ghirlandaio. It is now in the Museo Nazionale di Capodimonte in Naples.
