= Porta San Frediano =

Coordinates: 43°46′13.68″N 11°14′24.02″E

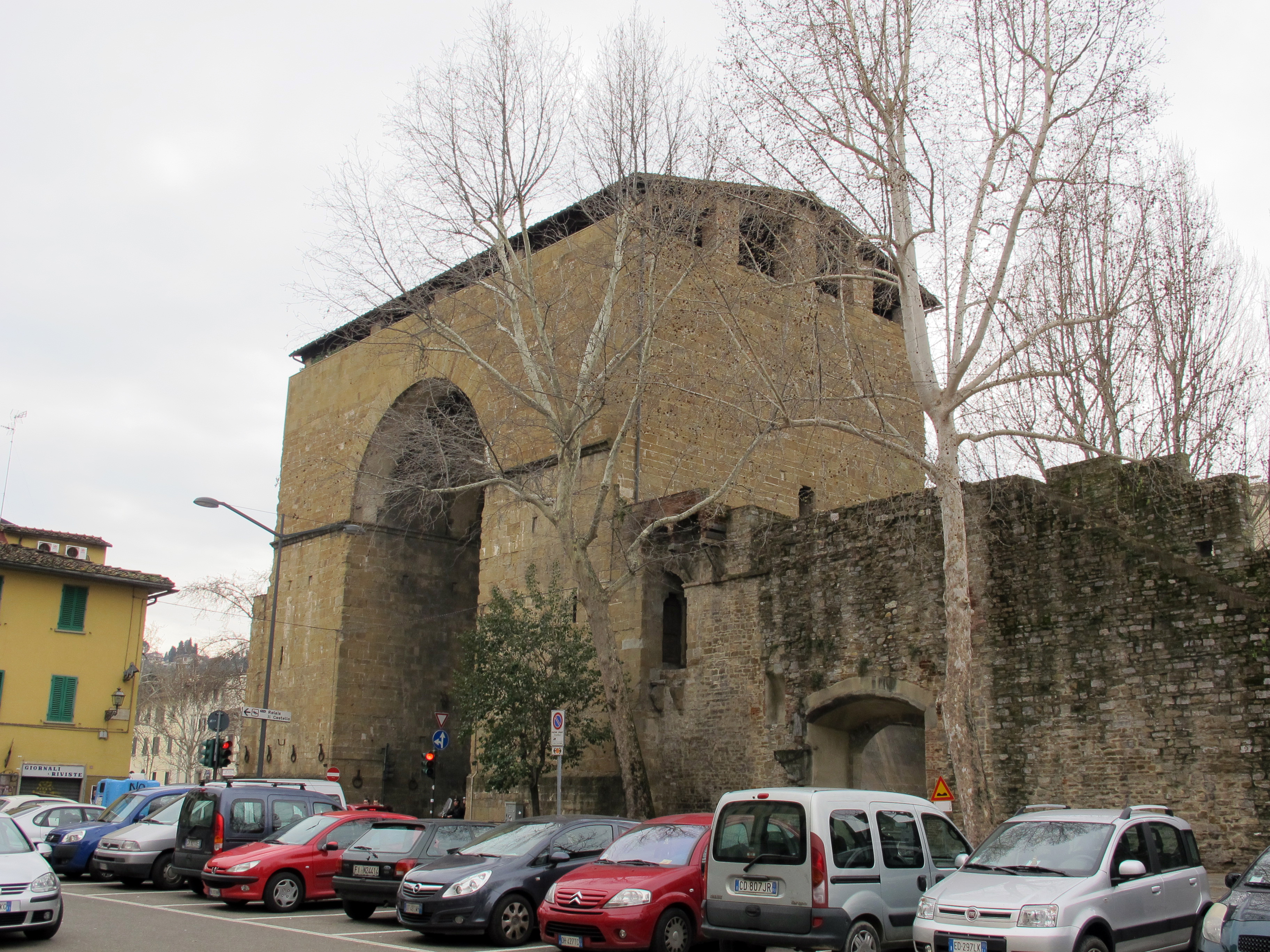
Porta San Frediano, external façade

The Porta San Frediano was the westernmost gate in the 13th-century walls of the Oltrarno section of Florence, region of Tuscany, Italy. It is located where Borgo San Frediano becomes Via Pisana. This was the access gate to the road to Pisa.

== History ==
This ancient gate is attributed to the architect Andrea Pisano, and is named after the nearby church of San Frediano, which was rebuilt as the church of San Frediano in Cestello. The gate was finished in 1332. In 1363 the Blessed Paola of the Monastery of the Angioli had a vision of Saint John the Baptist blessing Florence. This vision was interpreted as a premonition that the Florentines would defeat the Pisan army at the Battle of Cascina.

King Charles VIII of France entered Florence through this gate in 1494. A depiction of the gate in around that time can be seen in a painting by Filippino Lippi, the Madonna and Child with Saint John among Saints Martin of Tours and Catherine of Alexandria found in the Nerli Chapel of the church of Santo Spirito, Florence. The gate still has its large wooden and metal doors.

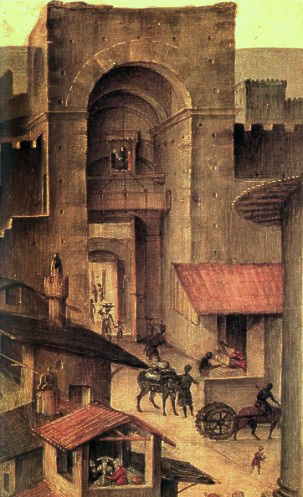
Depiction of the city gate in Filippino Lippi's 1493 painting with its imposing front, later deconstructed.
