= Madonna with Child and Saints (Filippino Lippi) =

Painting by Filippino Lippi

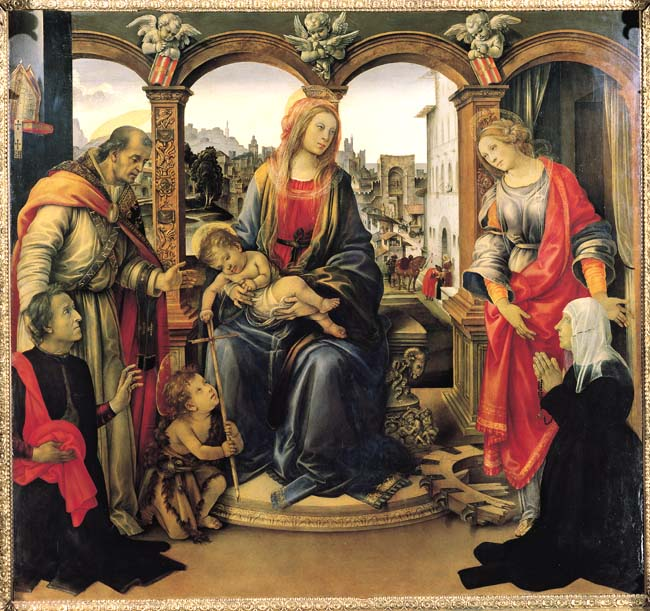
- Artist: Filippino Lippi
- Year: c. 1485–1488
- Medium: Oil on panel
- Dimensions: 160 cm × 180 cm (63 in × 71 in)
- Location: Santo Spirito, Florence

The Madonna with St. Catherine of Alexandria and St. Martin of Tours is a painting by the Italian Renaissance painter Filippino Lippi of c. 1485–1488. It is still in the church of Santo Spirito of Florence. The infant Saint John the Baptist, the patron saint of Florence, appears on the right hand side of the Virgin Mary in the centre. The Virgin is sitting upon a gold dias, dressed in her traditional colours including a red gown and a blue mantle. The infant Christ turns towards John, who is dressed in animal skins as appropriate for a desert saint and whose staff has a crossbar referring to the Crucifixion to come.

The painting is also known as Pala de' Nerli from the name of the commissioners, Tanai de' Nerli and his wife Nanna, who are shown in donor portraits at the sides. The choice of the saints is also connected to the personality of Nerli, who was particularly devoted to Saint Catherine of Alexandria (he baptized his daughter with her name) and was a member of the Company of San Martino de' Buonomini, a confraternity dedicated to good works following the example of Saint Martin of Tours, who here presents Tanai de' Nerli to the Virgin.

The background shows the influence of Early Netherlandish painting but also includes classical architecture. Several scholars have dated it to 1494 due to an alleged reference to the presence of Charles VIII of France in the city. However, the numerous decorations hinting at classical antiquities (the frieze in the loggia's pilasters, the goat head on the Virgin's seat and the frieze with the fight of the Tritons) would place it soon after his return from Rome.

Behind the loggia is an unusual scene of Florence with the Porta San Frediano gate and de' Nerli's palace. The commissioner is portrayed at the latter's door while hugging his daughter in front of his wife, while a groom cares his horse.
