= Annunziata Polyptych =

Polyptych by Filippino Lippi and Pietro Perugino

Annunziata Polyptych - Deposition from the Cross
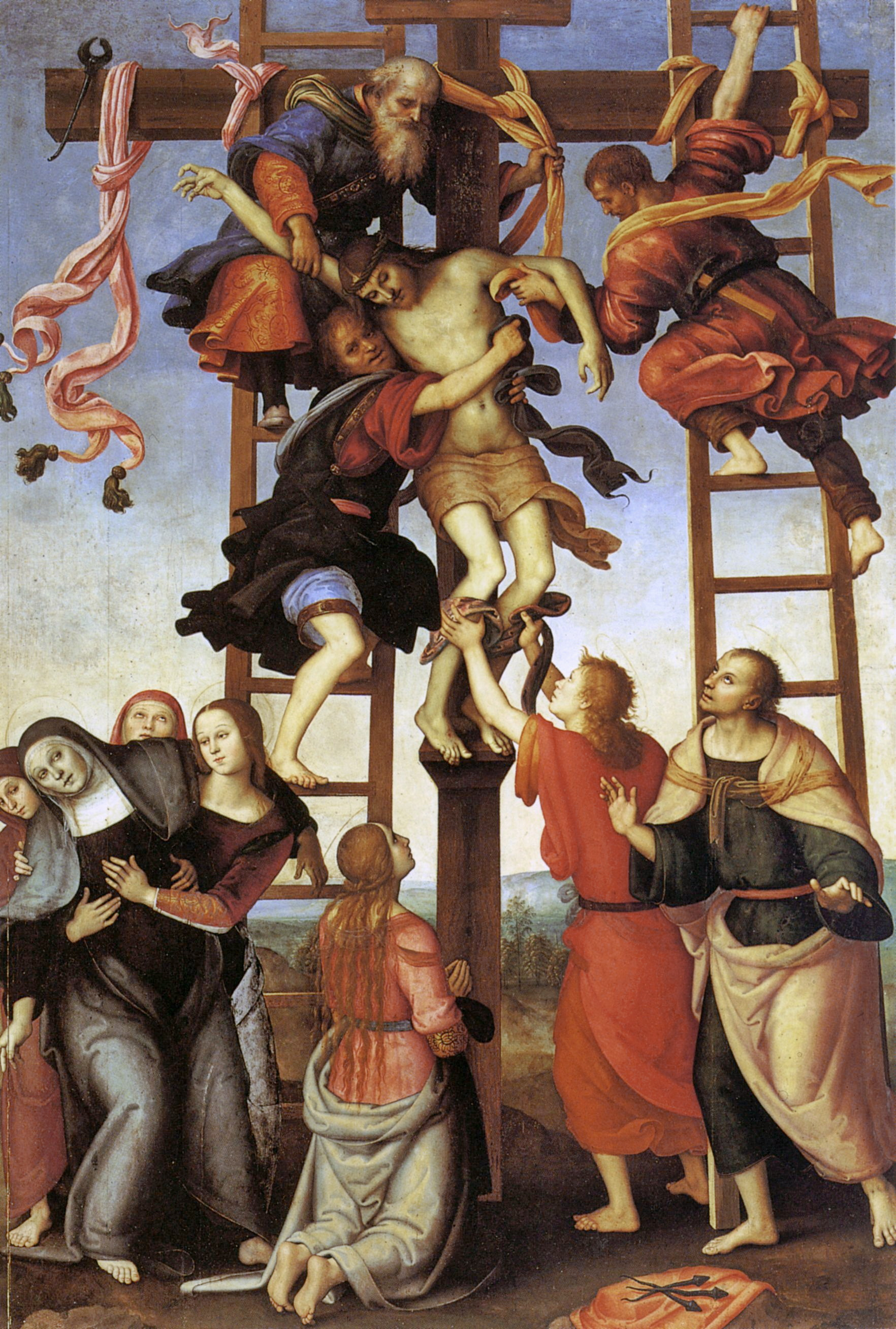
- Artist: Filippino Lippi and Pietro Perugino
- Year: 1504–1507
- Medium: Oil on panel
- Dimensions: 334 cm × 225 cm (131 in × 89 in)
- Location: Galleria dell’Accademia, Florence

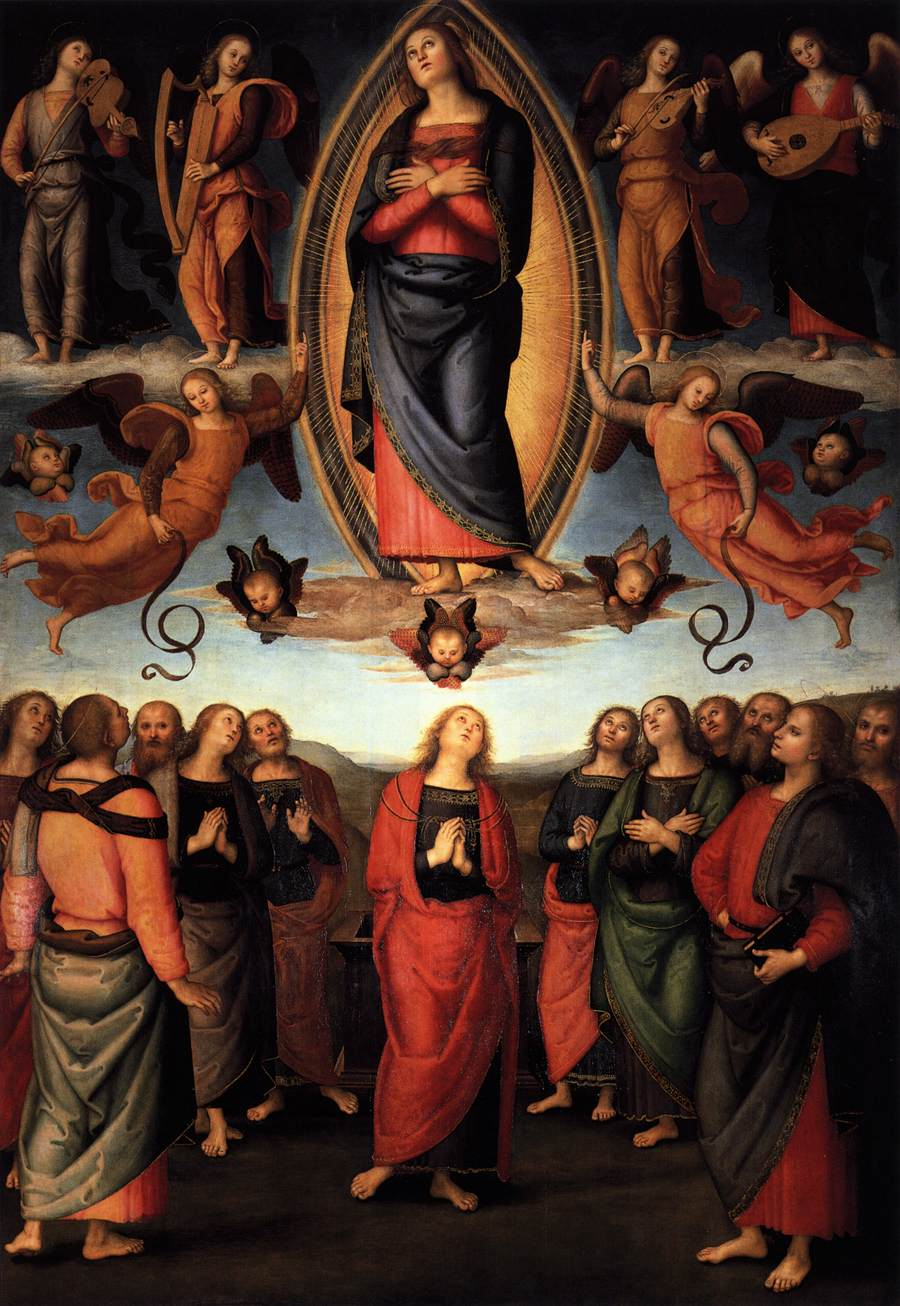
The Assumption of the Virgin, c. 1506, Pietro Perugino (Florence, SS. Annunziata, Cappella Rabatta).

The Annunziata Polyptych is an altarpiece made up of several panels, started by Filippino Lippi and finished by Pietro Perugino. One of the main panels depicts the Annunciation (in Basilica dell'Annunziata, Florence) and the panel in the other side, the Deposition from the Cross (in Galleria dell'Accademia, Florence). In addition, the altarpiece had six side panels (in museums in Germany, New Yoek and Rome) and five smaller paintings in the predella (all but one in the Art Institute of Chicago).

== History ==
The polyptych was originally commissioned to Filippino Lippi (son of the Florentine painter Filippo Lippi) for the high altar of the Santissima Annunziata in Florence. Lippi ceded the commission to Leonardo da Vinci, who executed a cartoon with St. Anne, the Virgin and the Child, before abandoing the commission and leaving Florence to work with Cesare Borgia. The work was thus reassigned to Lippi, who changed the theme completely. He completed the central section before his death in 1504. The painting was then entrusted to Pietro Perugino who completed it, as well as painting the secondary panels of the sides and the predella, by 1507.

In those years Perugino often reused the same cartoons, due to the large number of commissions, basing quality not in invention but in pictorial execution. However, with the new century, variety of invention had become a fundamental element, used to distinguish the leading artists from the lesser ones. Once finished, the Perugino was sharply criticized by the Florentines, due to the alleged lack of originality of the compositions.Vasari recounts that the painter defended himself saying: "I have executed the figures that you have praised before and that you have immensely enjoyed. If they displease you now and you no longer praise them, what can I do?"

The Annuziata Polyptych was Perugino's last work in Florence. After a brief stay in Rome the artist moved to the Italian province of Umbria.

The work was originally painted on two sides: the Deposition facing the faithful and the Assumption facing the presbytery. After the panel was split in two, the former was moved to the Grand Duke's collections and then to the Gallerie dell'Accademia in 1954. The Assumption remained in the church, and was later moved to the Rabatta Chapel.

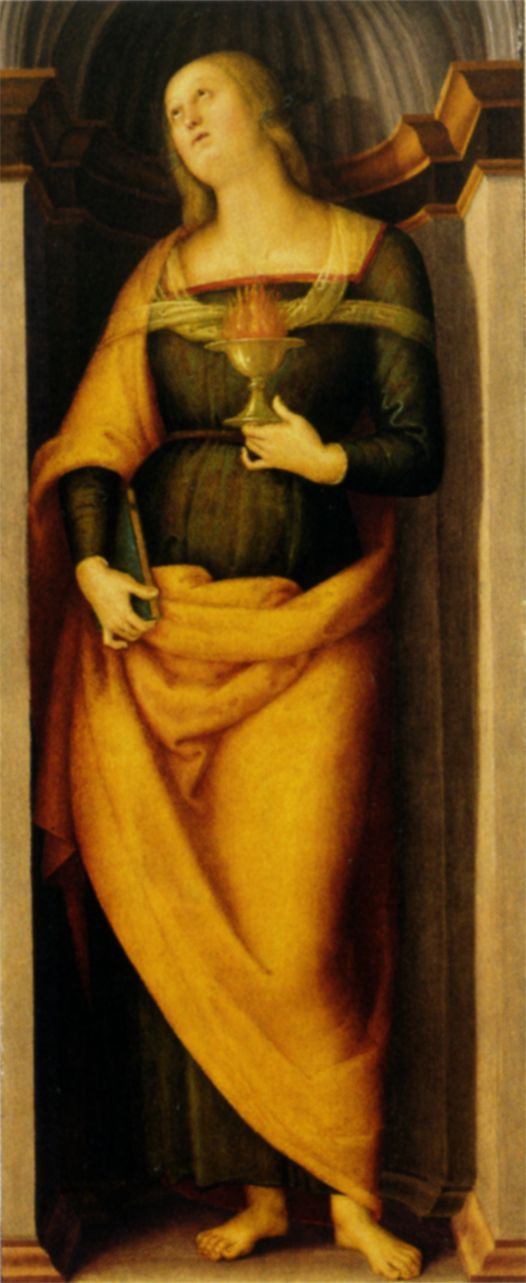
Saint Lucy from the side panels of the polyptych .

According to Giorgio Vasari, Lippi executed the upper part of the Deposition. The face of Jesus was completed by Perugino. The latter also painted the lower part of the work, characterized by his typical serene faces and the distant landscape. Perugino's assistants painted a great number of details, especially in the side panels.

Fice panels contained in a wooden frame designed by Baccio d'Agnolocompleted the polyptych complex. They are today in the Lindenau-Museum in Altenburg, Germany); in the Metropolitan Museum of Art in New York; in the Galleria Nazionale d'Arte Antica in Rome; and in a private collection in South Africa.

The polyptych was completed by five paintings in the predella; all but one currently in the Art Institute of Chicago.

At the Art Institute of Chicago:

- Nativity
- Baptism of Christ
- The Samaritan Girl at the Pit
- Noli me tangere

At the Metropolitan Museum of Art in New York:

- Resurrection of Christ

== Description ==
The Deposition shows the moment in which Jesus Christ is lowered from the cross after his death. Four men are carrying out the task by using ladders: two hold the arms, one embraces the torso, and a fourth holds the shins with the help of a piece of cloth.

On the ground at the left is the Virgin, fainting in the medieval representation known as Swoon of the Virgin, and is supported by other women. Mary Magdalene is depicted praying fervently at the foot of the cross. On the right, depicted in a surprised posture or as if asking the men to lower Christ carefully, is St. John the Apostle. In front of him on the ground, are the nails of the crucifixion.

Paintings in the predella by Perugino

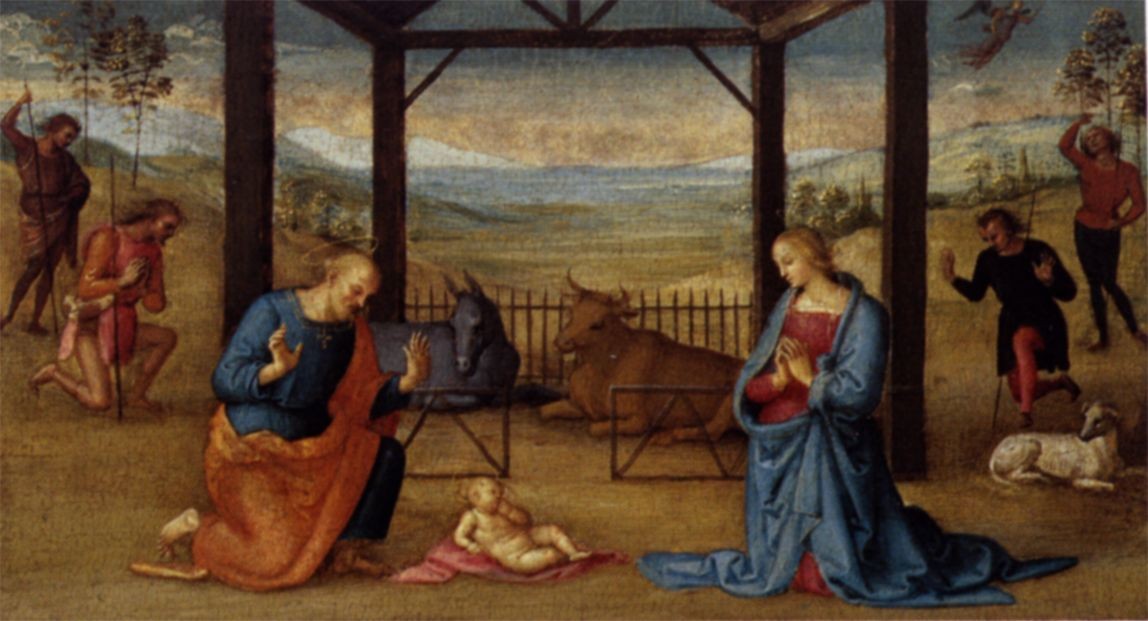
Nativity (Art Institute of Chicago)

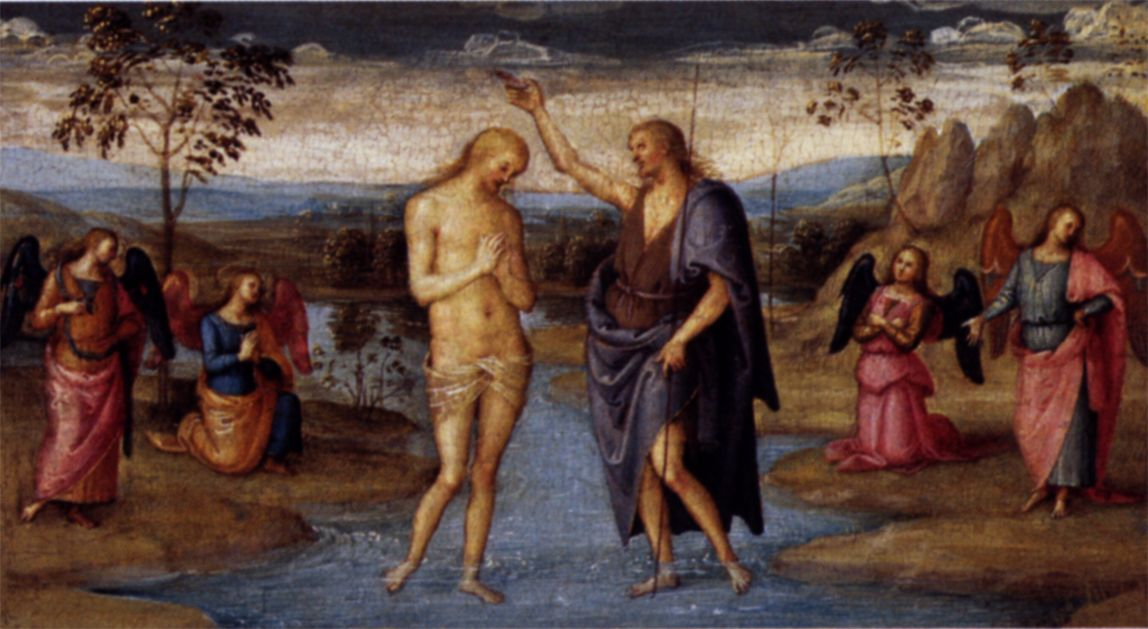
Baptism of Christ (Art Institute of Chicago)
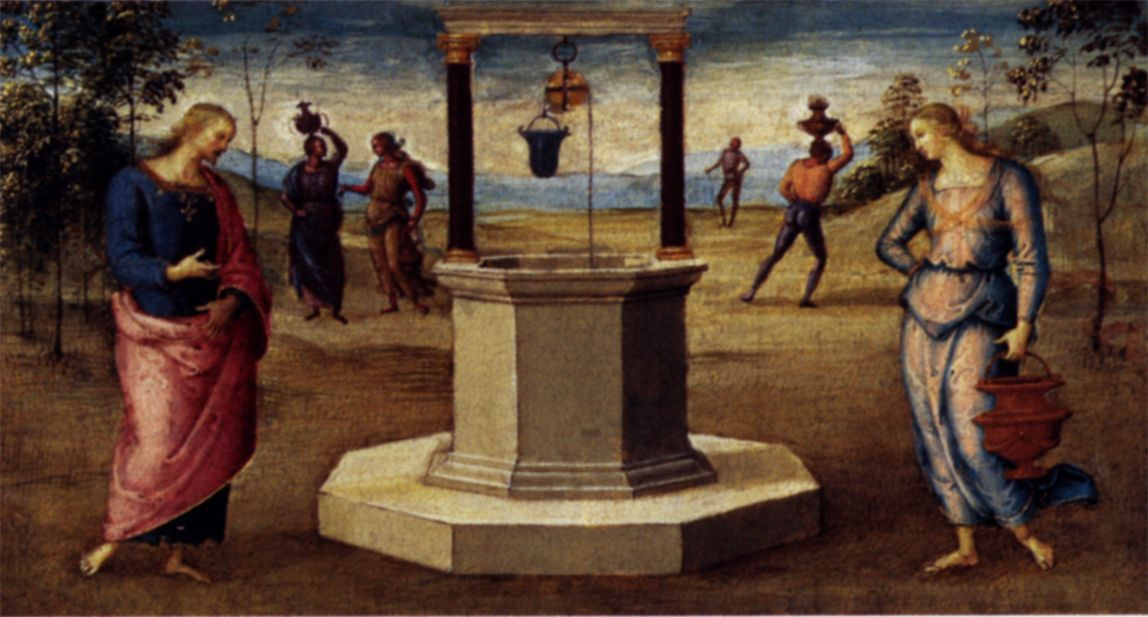
The Samaritan Girl at the Pit (Art Institute of Chicago)

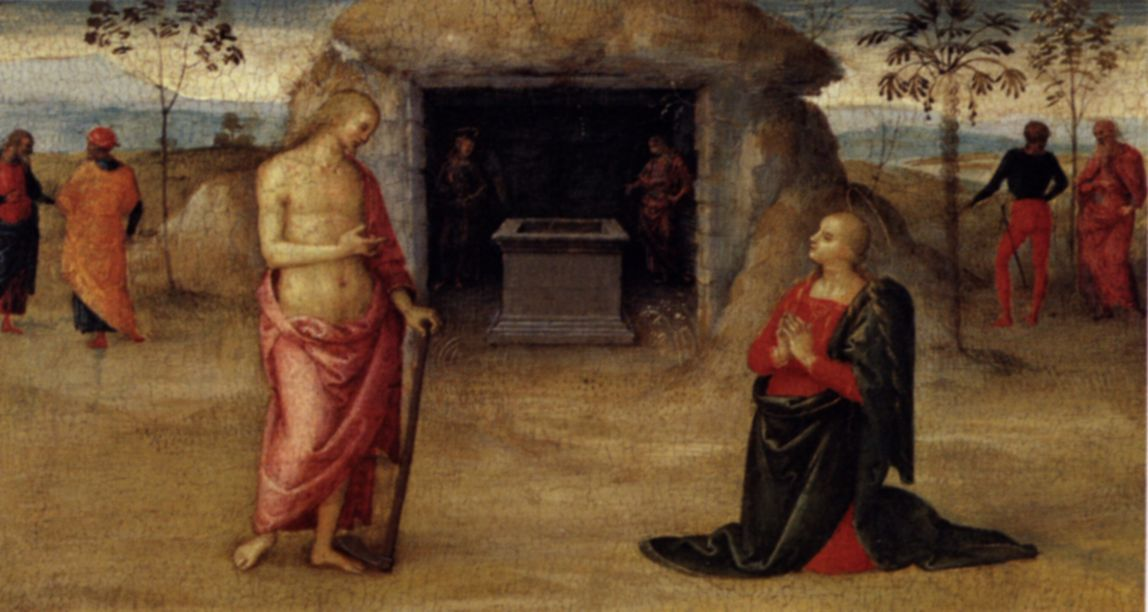
"Noli me tangere" (Art Institute of Chicago)

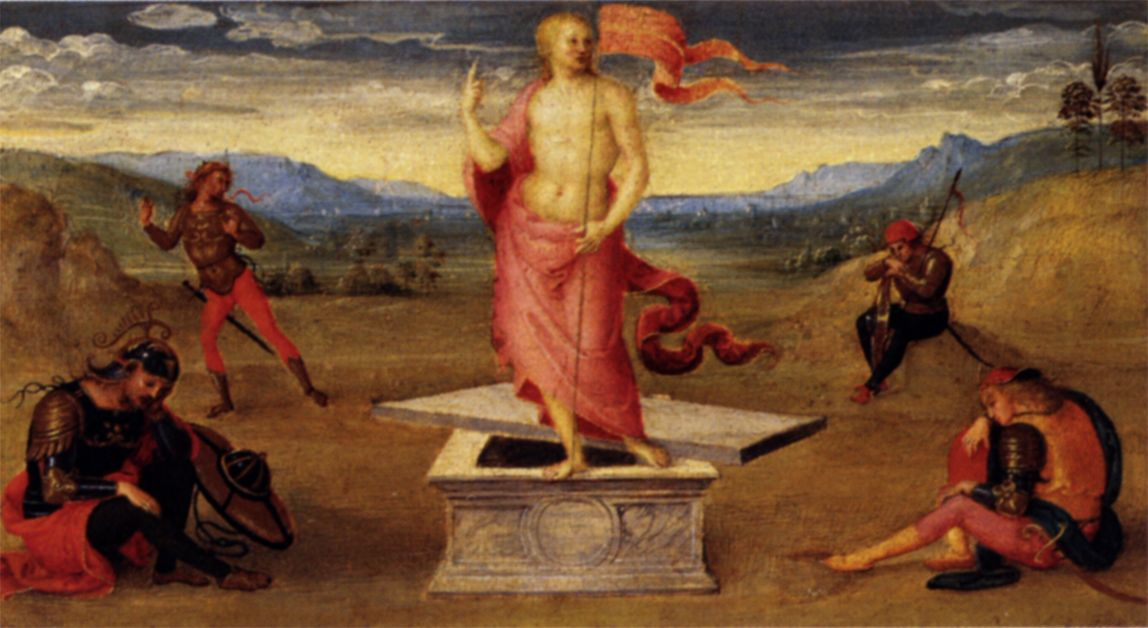
Resurrection of Christ (Metropolitan Museum of Art, New York)

== Sources ==
- Gallerie dell'Accademia. Florence: Giunti. 1999.
- Garibaldi, Vittoria (2004). "Perugino". Pittori del Rinascimento. Florence: Scala. ISBN 88-8117-099-X.
