= Carafa Chapel =

Chapel in the church of Santa Maria sopra Minerva, Rome

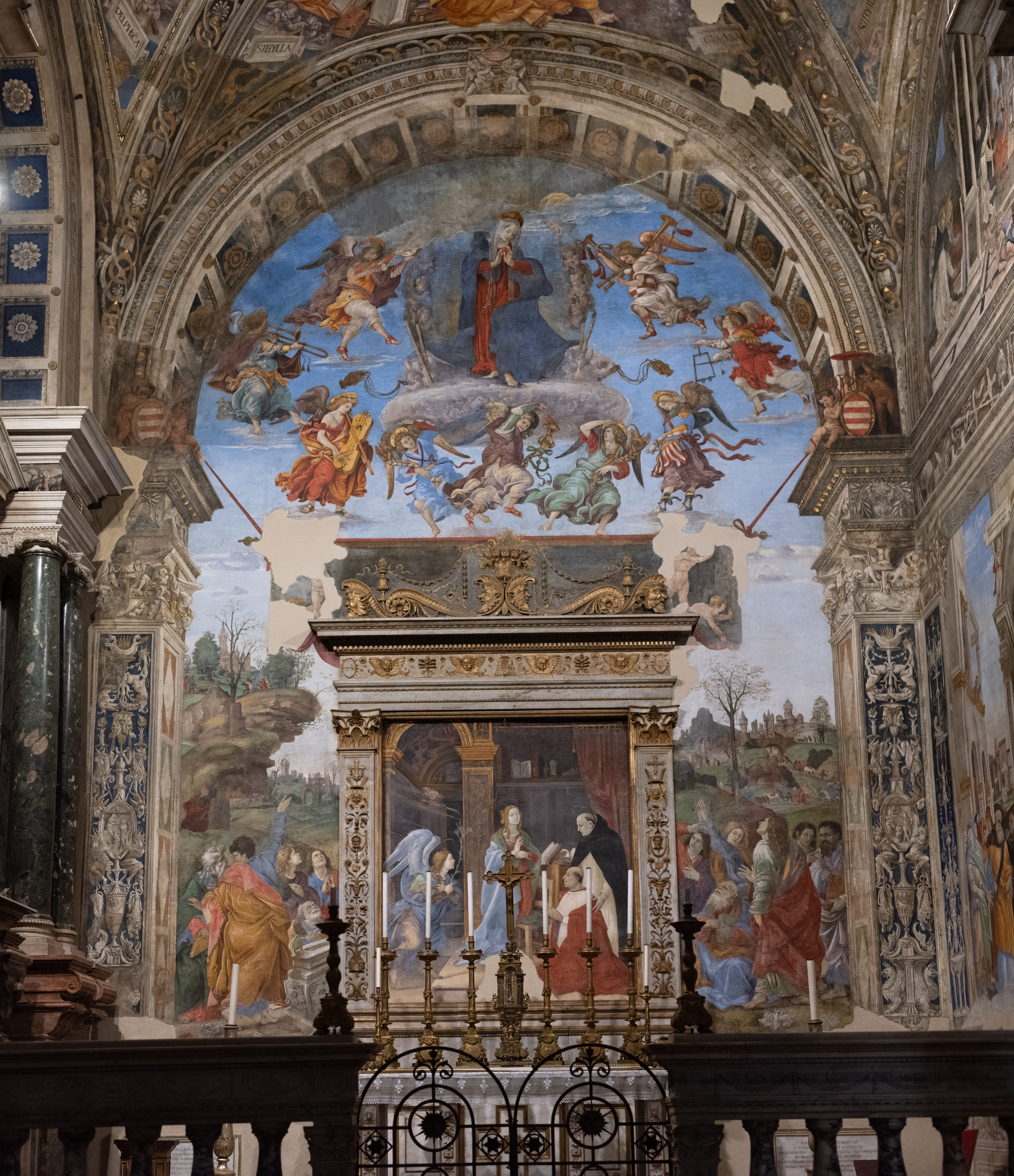
View of the chapel

The Carafa Chapel (Italian: Cappella Carafa) is a chapel in the church of Santa Maria sopra Minerva, Rome, Italy, known for a series of frescoes by Filippino Lippi.

== History ==
The chapel, located in the right side of the basilica and dedicated to St. Mary and St. Thomas of Aquino, was built in the late 15th century by the will of Cardinal Oliviero Carafa. He was a member of the Dominicans, who at the time administered the church, and his palace was located nearby.

Lorenzo de' Medici of Florence recommended to Cardinal Carafa that he grant the commission to decorate the chapel to Filippino Lippi, then in his thirties. To fulfill the order, the artist had to halt the works at the Filippo Strozzi Chapel in Santa Maria Novella, which he had begun in 1487 and which he would complete in 1502. Documents attest Lippi's presence in Rome as early as 27 August 1488, working with his assistant Raffaellino del Garbo. For the painter, it was the first large fresco cycle, and his first (and only) work in Rome. The paintings were already completed in 1493, when they were visited by Pope Alexander VI.

Raffaellino also decorated a smaller room annexed to the chapel, which would house Carafa's body after his death, with the Stories of Virginia and other chastity-related themes.

== Description ==
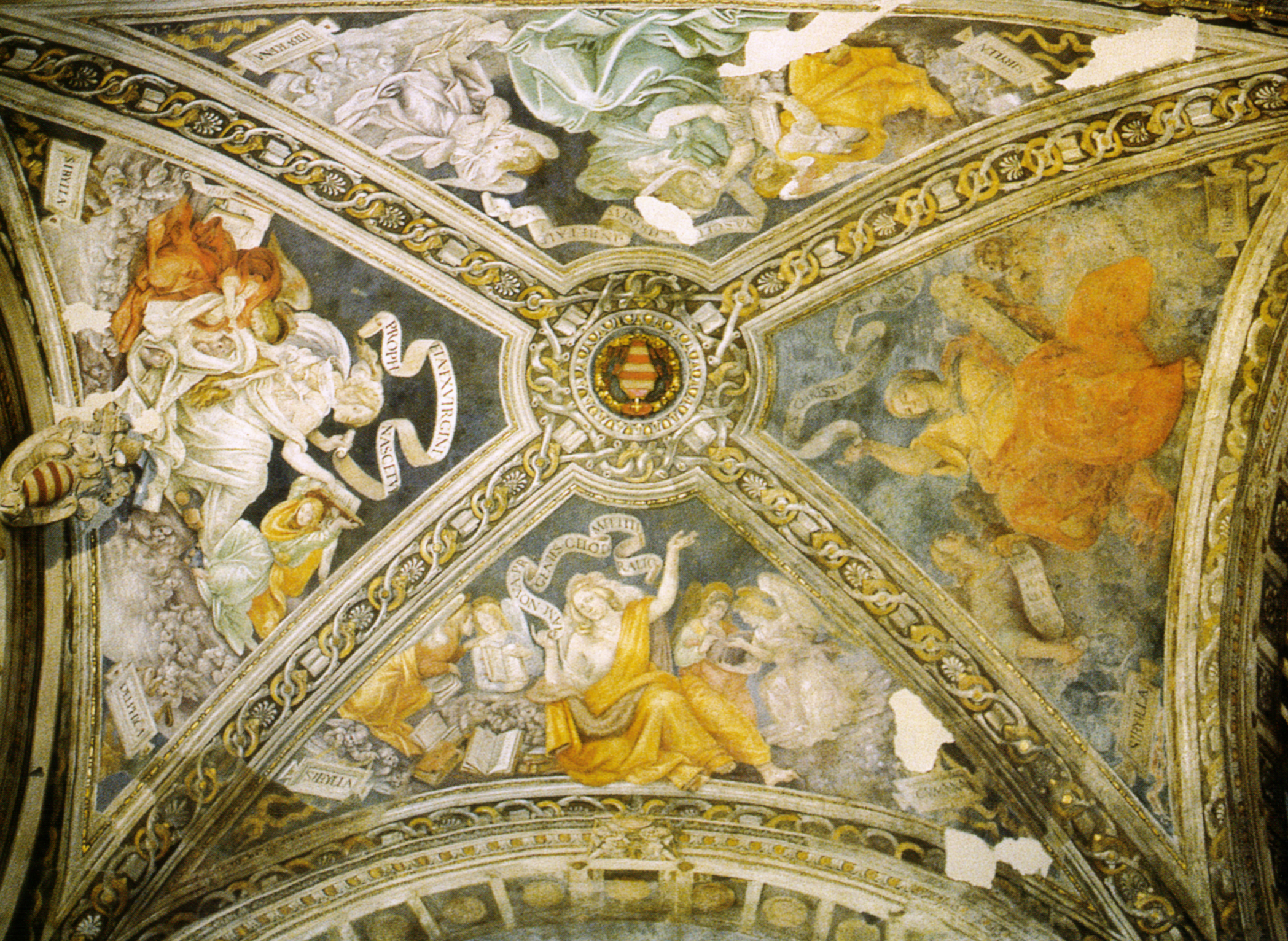
The vault

=== Vault ===
The decoration began from the vault, which was divided into four triangular sectors in which Filippino depicted four Sibyls. In the middle is the coat of arms of the Carafa family inside a medallion. The frame of the scenes includes a pattern of branches twisting in rings and diamonds (this is a symbol of Lorenzo de' Medici), intermingled with books and palms. The allusion to the Medici family is generally considered a thanksgiving for Lorenzo's intercession towards Carafa in favour of the painter, and for his pacification work during the Barons' Conspiracy, which had torn apart Carafa's homeland, the Kingdom of Naples, in 1485. The books refer to the Cardinal's intellectual interests.

In the Sibyls, Filippi was the first Florentine painter to adopt the sotto in su ("from below") perspective. In this, he was likely inspired by the Ascension of Mary fresco by Melozzo da Forlì, then in the Santi Apostoli basilica. The Sibyls were symbols of wisdom and knowledge; they are portrayed holding cartouches with St. Thomas' statements.

=== Central walls ===
The end wall is decorated with a fresco above the high altar with the Annunciation within a stucco frame and the Assumption of the Virgin at the sides and in the upper section. The scene is located within a fictive arch supported by pilasters with decorated candelabre. The subjects portrayed include a Roman ship with an olive tree branch, an allusion to Oliverio Carafa's command of the papal fleet (1472) against the Turks. Lippi copied the ship from a Roman relief in the basilica of San Lorenzo fuori le Mura (now in the Musei Capitolini).

The frieze, which is now only partially preserved, shows other subjects related to the Cardinal's activities, while on the upper frame are angels with the Carafa coat of arms.

== Annunciation ==
For the Annunciation, Lippi adopted a rather unusual composition with St. Thomas presenting to Mary the kneeling Cardinal Carafa. The presence of the donor was a common theme, as in Antoniazzo Romano's Annunciation in the same church. Here, however, Mary is depicted as both glancing at the angel, and at the same time, addressing and blessing with her right hand, Carafa. The scene is set in an interior location where Mary is kneeling on a chair next to a bookrest filled with books. Behind a curtain is a still life depiction, including a shelf with books, a carafe (a symbol for transparent purity), and an olive tree branch. The two latter elements form a rebus of Oliviero Carafa's name.

On the left is a hall with a barrel vault, showing the Carafa coat of arms, perhaps modeled on the Cardinal's palace. The scene is framed by a rich frieze decorated with vases, fruit, columns and grottesche, the latter thought to be inspired by the recently discovered paintings in the Domus Aurea.

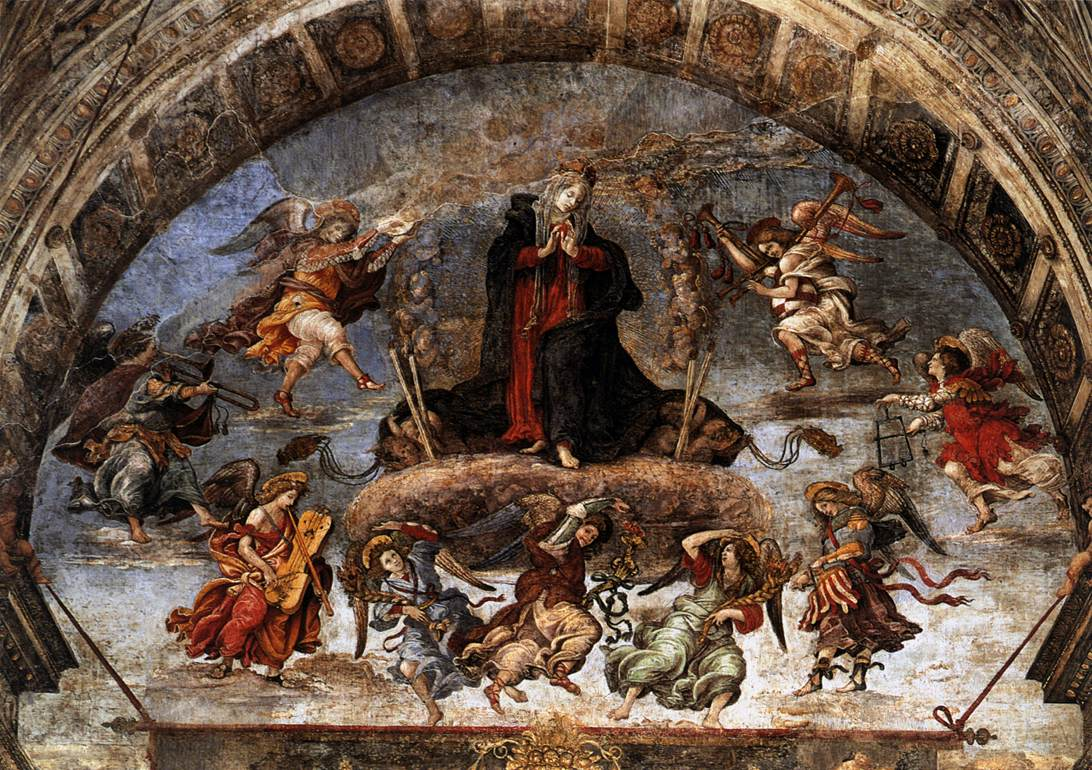
Assumption

== Assumption ==
The Assumption, flanked by the depictions of saints staring at its scene, shows the Virgin ascending on a cloud which is pushed upwards by a group of angels; at her sides are burning candles, angels spreading incense, and by a luminous mandorla of cherubs. The two thuribles are inspired by those painted by Sandro Botticelli in the Punishment of the Rebels fresco in the Sistine Chapel, and to which Lippi perhaps collaborated.

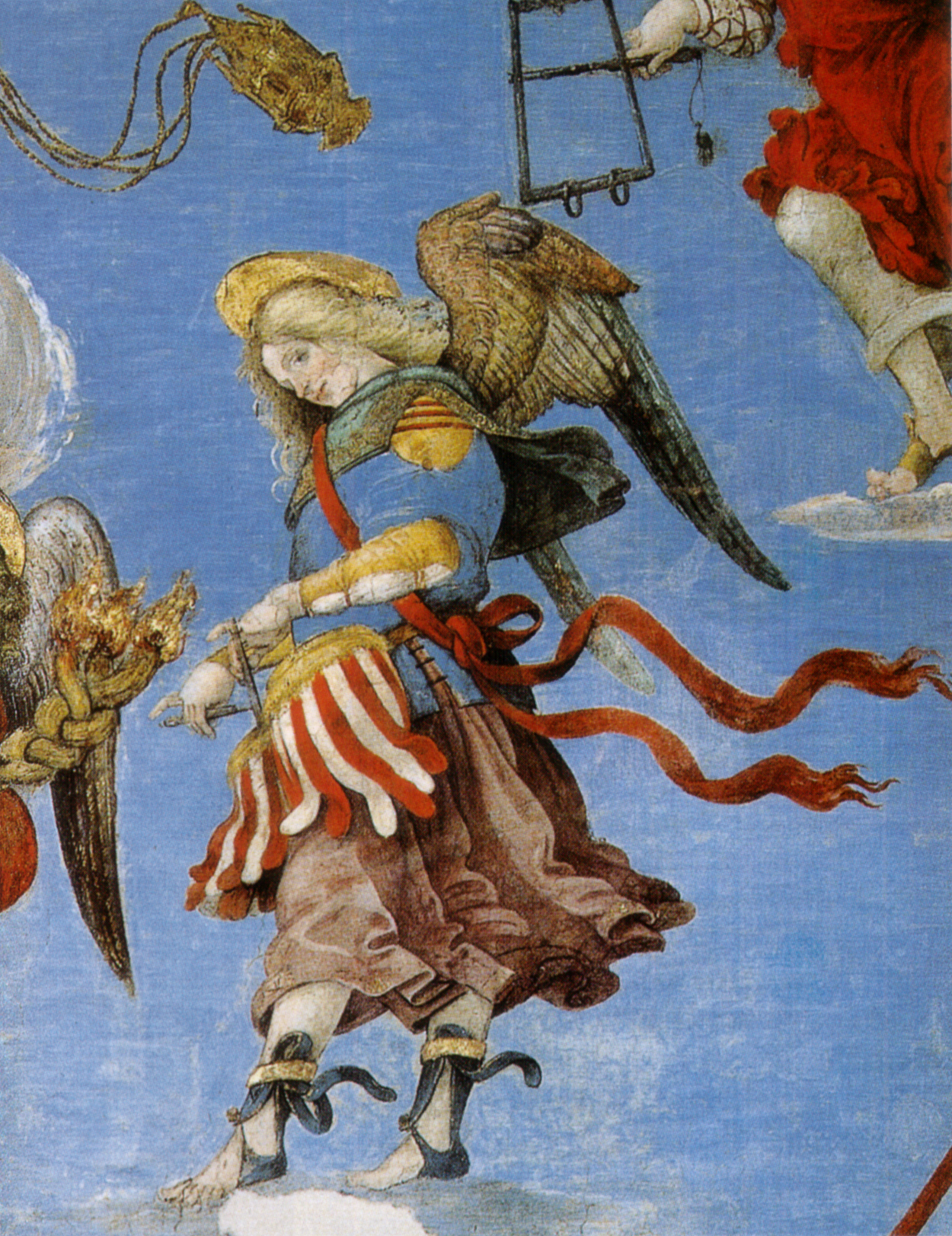
Detail of an angel with drum

The Virgin is portrayed traditionally, from a frontal point of view; more original are the angels dancing around her, depicted da sotto in su like those of Melozzo da Forlì. The angels, in clockwise order, hold a drum, a trumpet, a psaltery, torches (the three ones who are pushing the cloud), a drum (at the waist), a triangle of trapezoidal shape, and a cornamuse in colors which hint at the Carafa's crest. The instruments are typical of the time's military bands, and are another allusion to Carafa's naval success in Turkey.

In the lower sector, behind the apostles is a procession of exotic characters and animals, which is perhaps a reference to the triumph conceded to the cardinal after his return from the naval expedition. Lippi had likely seen in Florence a giraffe after it had been donated to Lorenzo de' Medici a few years before, and had created a popular enthusiasm.

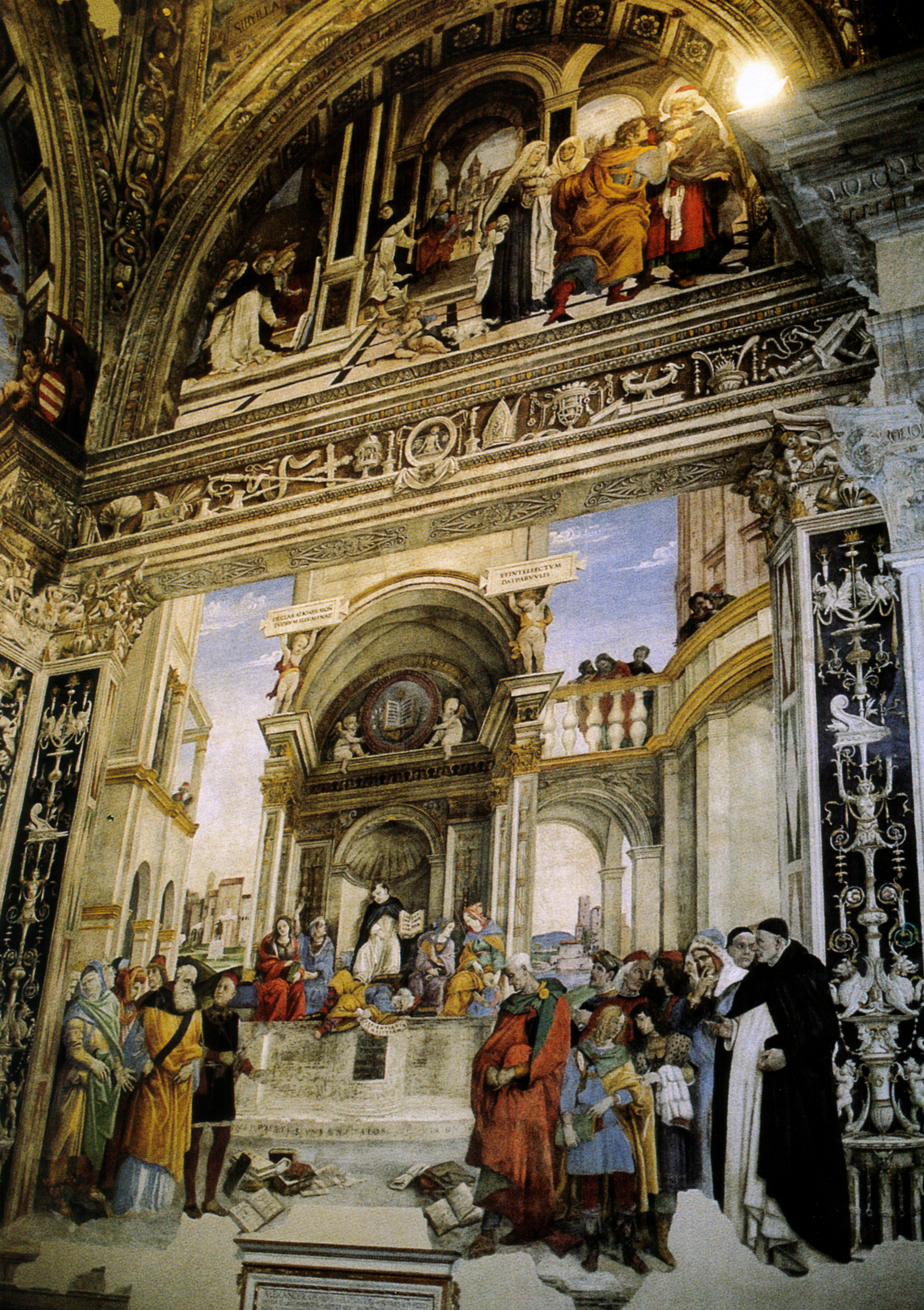
Right wall

=== Left and right walls ===
On the left wall is the funerary monument of Pope Paul IV, another member of the Carafa family, by Pirro Ligorio. For its creation, Lippi's frescoes of Vices and Virtues were destroyed and are now known only through Giorgio Vasari's description.

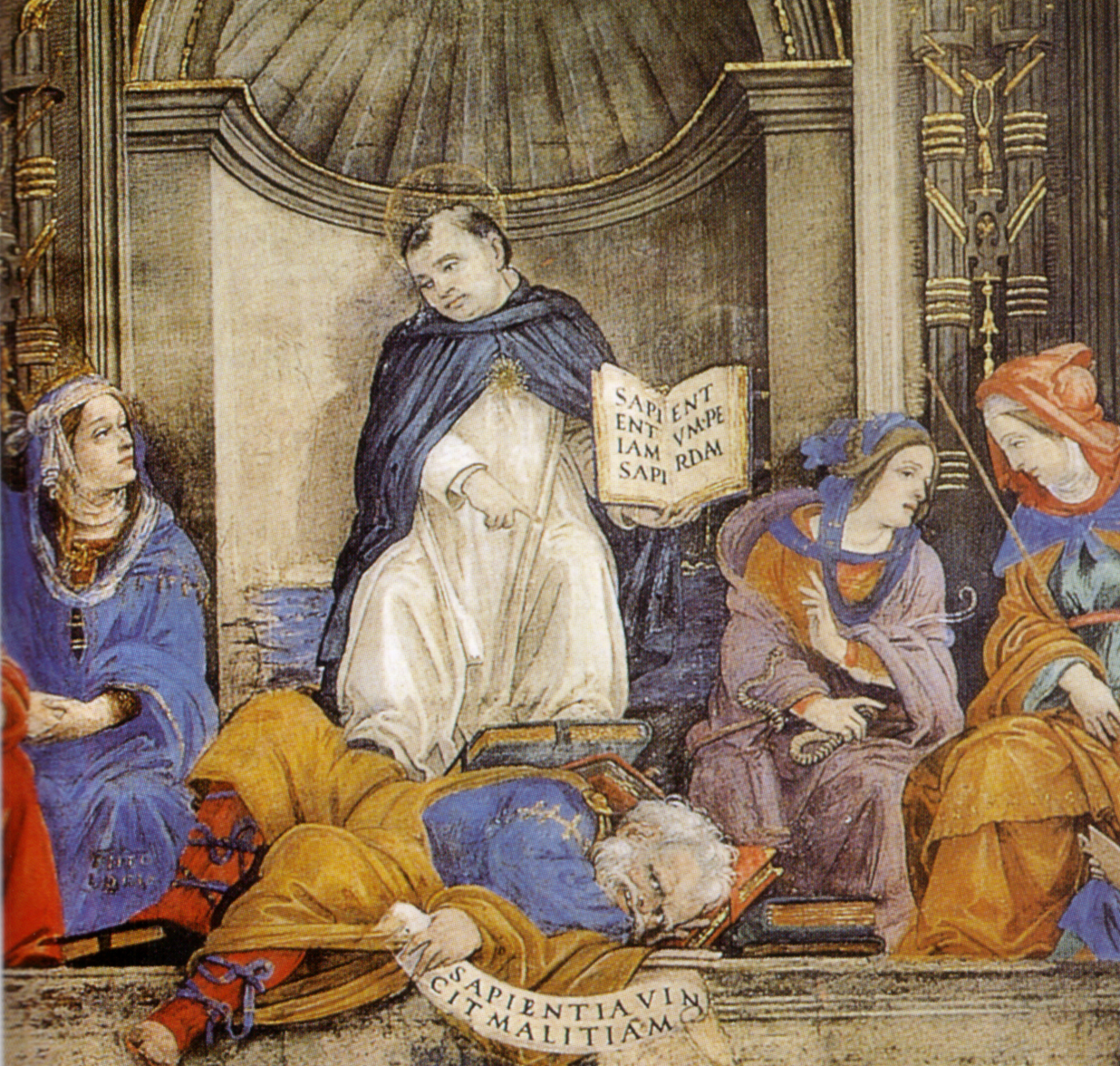
Dispute of St. Thomas, detail

The right wall is characterized by a painted architecture similar to that in the central wall, but is divided into a lunette and a central scene by a frieze. They portray, respectively, The Dispute of St. Thomas, or "The Triumph of St Thomas Aquinas over the Heretics," and the Miracle of the Book.

The scene of St. Thomas is enclosed within a cross-vaulted pavilion with a round arch, which leads to a terrace; this is annexed to an edifice from which a group of characters is leaning out. In the niche is St. Thomas of Aquino surrounded by symbolic characters and others forming two further, symmetrical groups at the feet of the pavilion.

Thomas is holding an open book, which must be the bible, with the inscription in Latin Sapientiam sapientum perdam ("I will destroy the scholar's knowledge (the wisdom of the wise)"), taken from St. Paul's words in the bible, which in turn refer to an oracle quoted by Isaiah. At his feet is a figure covered by books, symbolizing Sin, holding a strip of parchment with the inscription Sapientia vincit malitiam ("Wisdom defeats Wickedness"), an allusion to the importance attributed by Dominicans to knowledge in the fight against heresy and vice. The women at the saint's sides are, as recognizable by their labels, personifications of Philosophy, Theology (with a crown, pointing upward), Socratic Dialectics (with a snake) and Grammar, portrayed while teaching a youth (the staff would be used to punish any sign of laziness).

The characters in the foreground are mostly heretics (also identified by golden inscriptions on their garments) including the Persian prophet Mani, founder of Manicheanism, with a finger on his lips, Eutyches with a pearl earring, Sabellius (whose figures resembles the depiction of Dacian prisoners in the Arch of Constantine), Arius and others. The books on the ground are the heretics' book, about to be burned. On the right is a Dominican friar, who has been identified as Gioacchino Torriani, at the time prior of the order. Also on the right is Niccolò di Pitigliano, then commander of the papal army, shown before executing the Saint's condemnation.

The two buildings on the sides resemble contemporary examples in Umbrian painting, such as the Pinturicchio's Funerals of Saint Bernardino in the Bufalini Chapel of Santa Maria in Aracoeli. On the left is a cityscape including a depiction of Equestrian statue of Marcus Aurelius, which at the time was in the Lateran and was believed to portray the emperor Constantine.

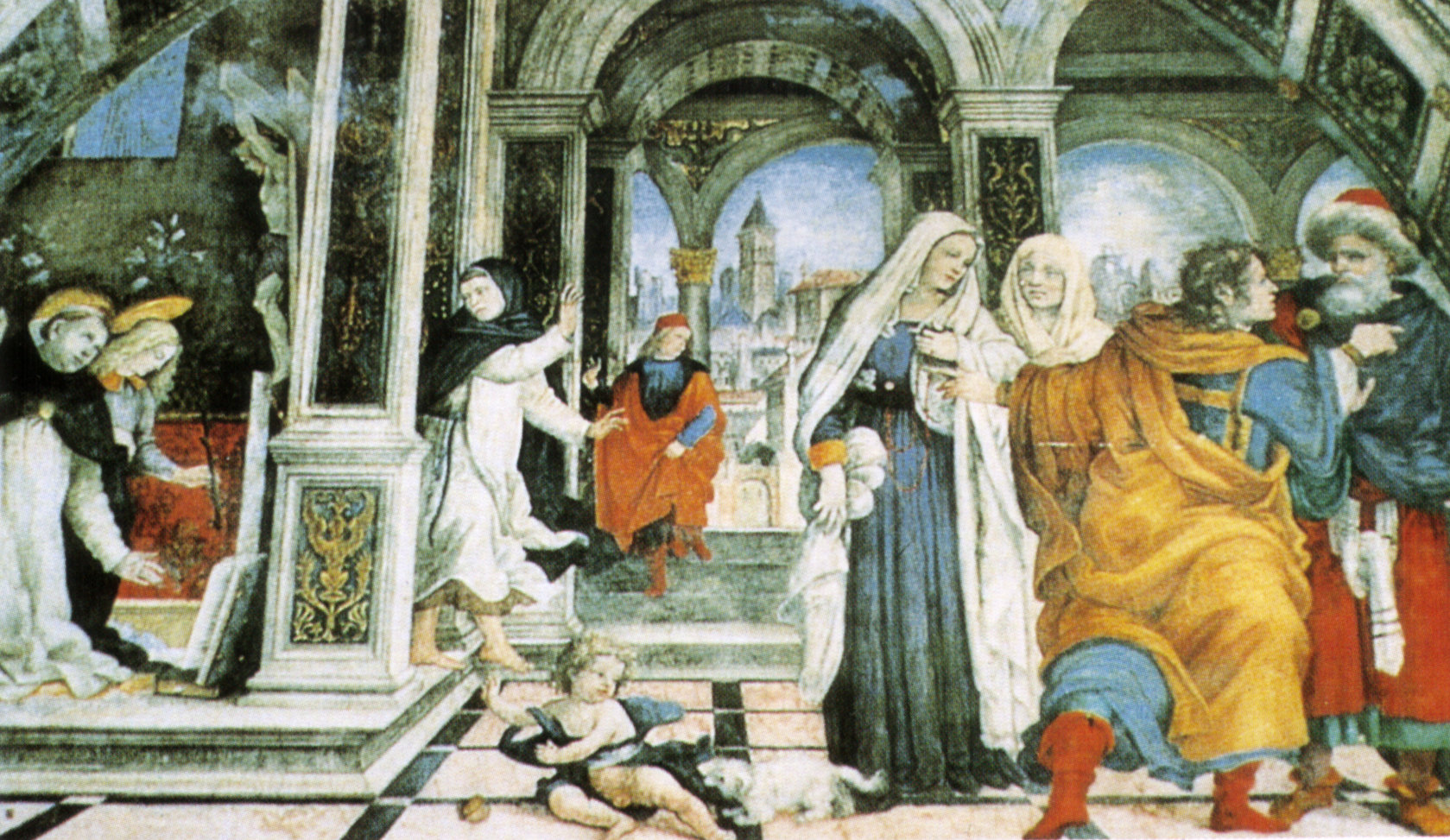
The lunette

The lunette contains further episodes of the life of St. Thomas, such as the Miracle of the Book. In the right background is a loggia, behind which is a city, and which a character is descending from a staircase. The characters have been variously interpreted. The small dog attacking a boy is usually a representation of the Devil threatening the youth's purity. The woman with monastic garments and a rosary inside the belt has been seen as a personification of the Catholic Church, and in this case the man on the stairs would be her husband, Christ, whose passion is symbolized by the red cloak (and, accordingly, the child would represent the clergy borne by them).

The character on the right, dressed as a Muslim, is addressed by a man pointing at the woman (an allusion to the man's need to convert). The woman in the background would be a personification of the Synagogue, an allusion also contained in Botticelli's Trials of Christ in the Sistine Chapel.

== See also ==
- Bufalini Chapel

== Sources ==
- Cosmo, Giulia (2001). Filippino Lippi. Florence: Giunti. pp. 13–30. ISBN 88-09-02031-6.
- Geiger, Gail L. (1986). Filippino Lippi's Carafa Chapel : Renaissance art in Rome. Kirksville, Mo.: Sixteenth Century Journal Publishers. ISBN 0-940474-05-0.
