= Filippino Lippi =

Italian painter (1457–1504)

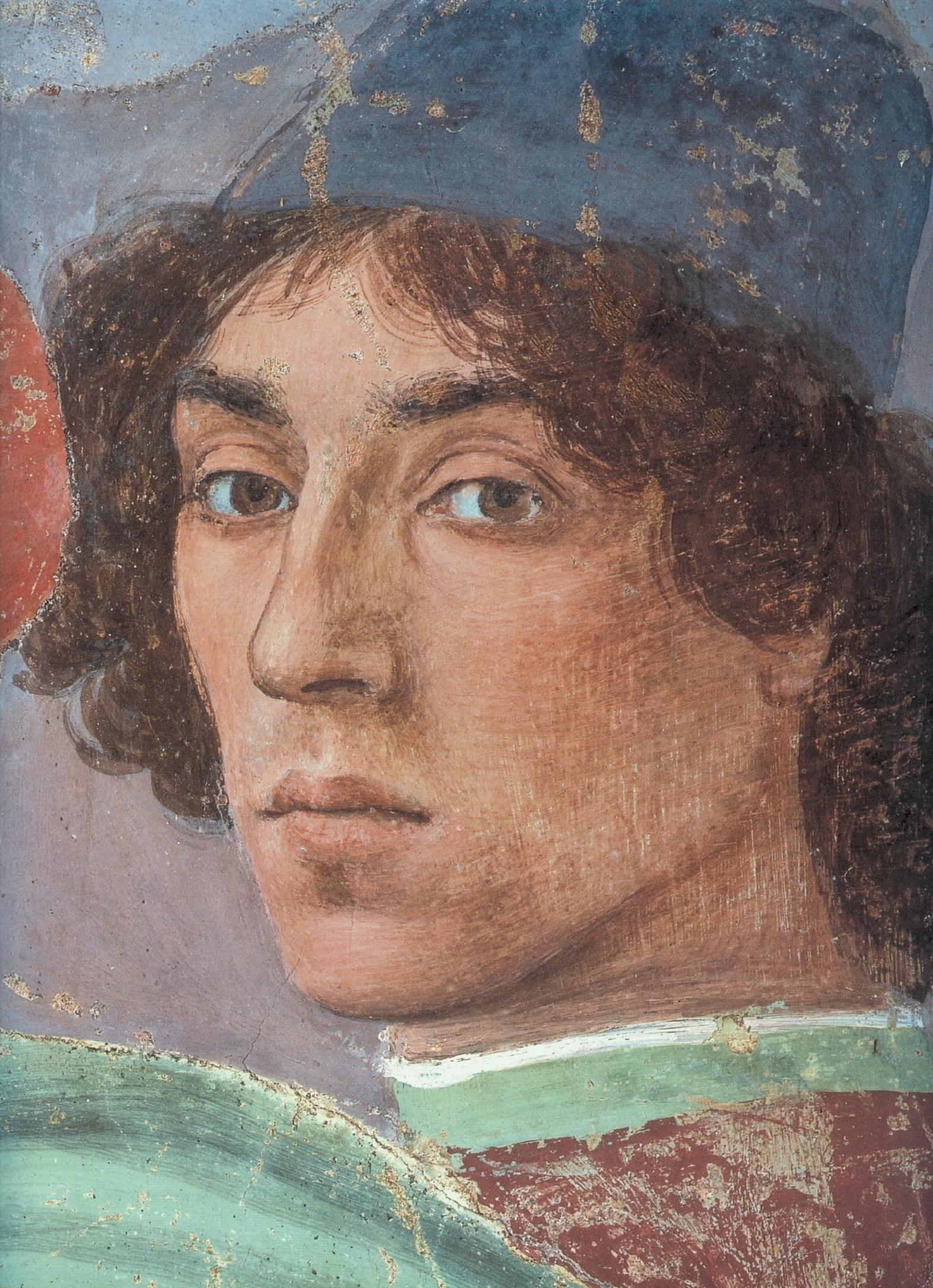
- Self-portrait – detail from the Brancacci Chapel fresco The Dispute with Simon Magus (1481–1482), Santa Maria del Carmine, Florence, Italy
- Born: Filippo Lippi probably 1457; Prato, Republic of Florence
- Died: 18 April 1504 (aged 47); Florence, Republic of Florence
- Education: Filippo Lippi
- Known for: Painting, fresco
- Notable work: Apparition of the Virgin to St. Bernard; Adoration of the Magi
- Movement: Italian Renaissance

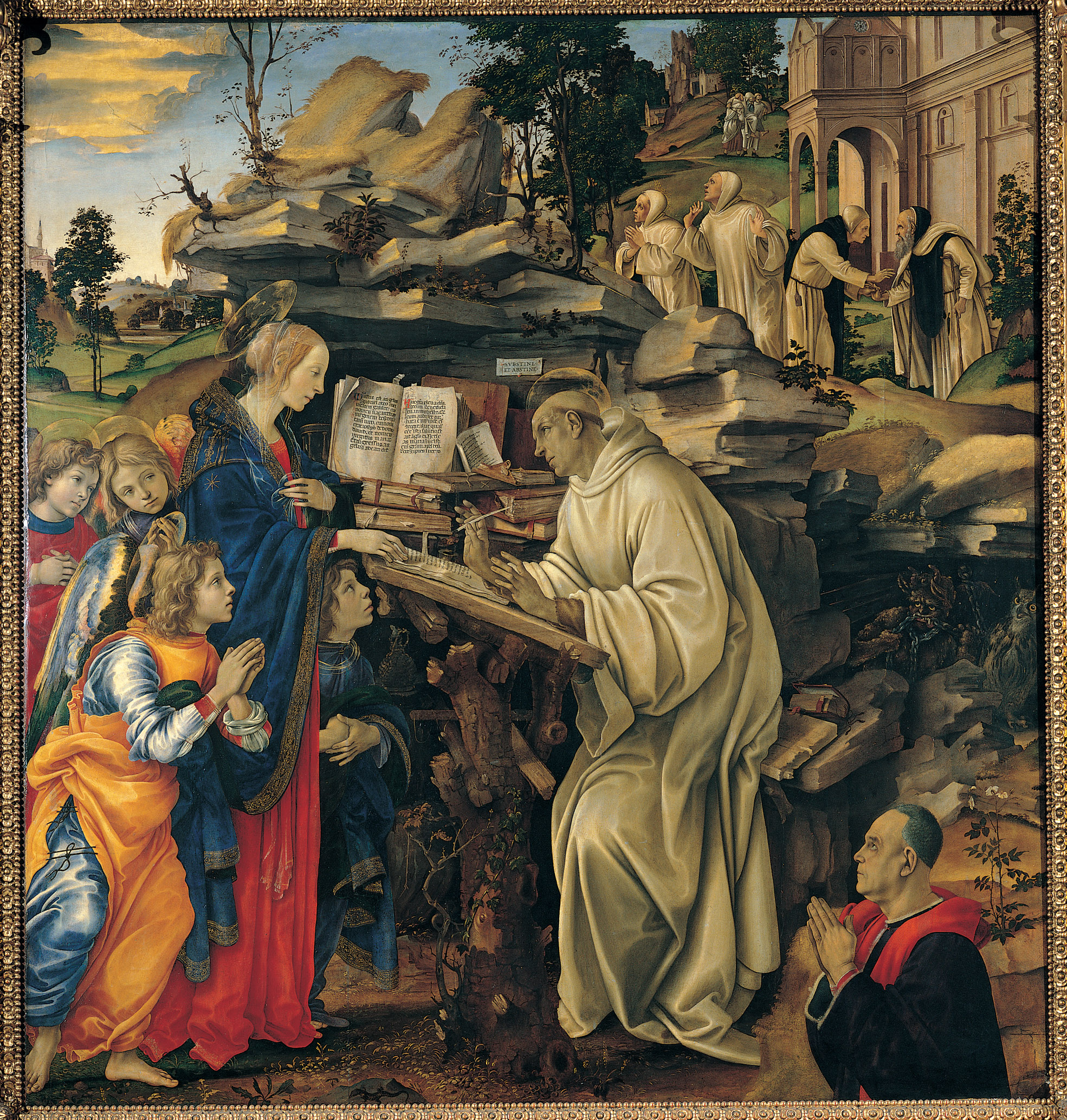
Apparition of The Virgin to St. Bernard (1485–1487)

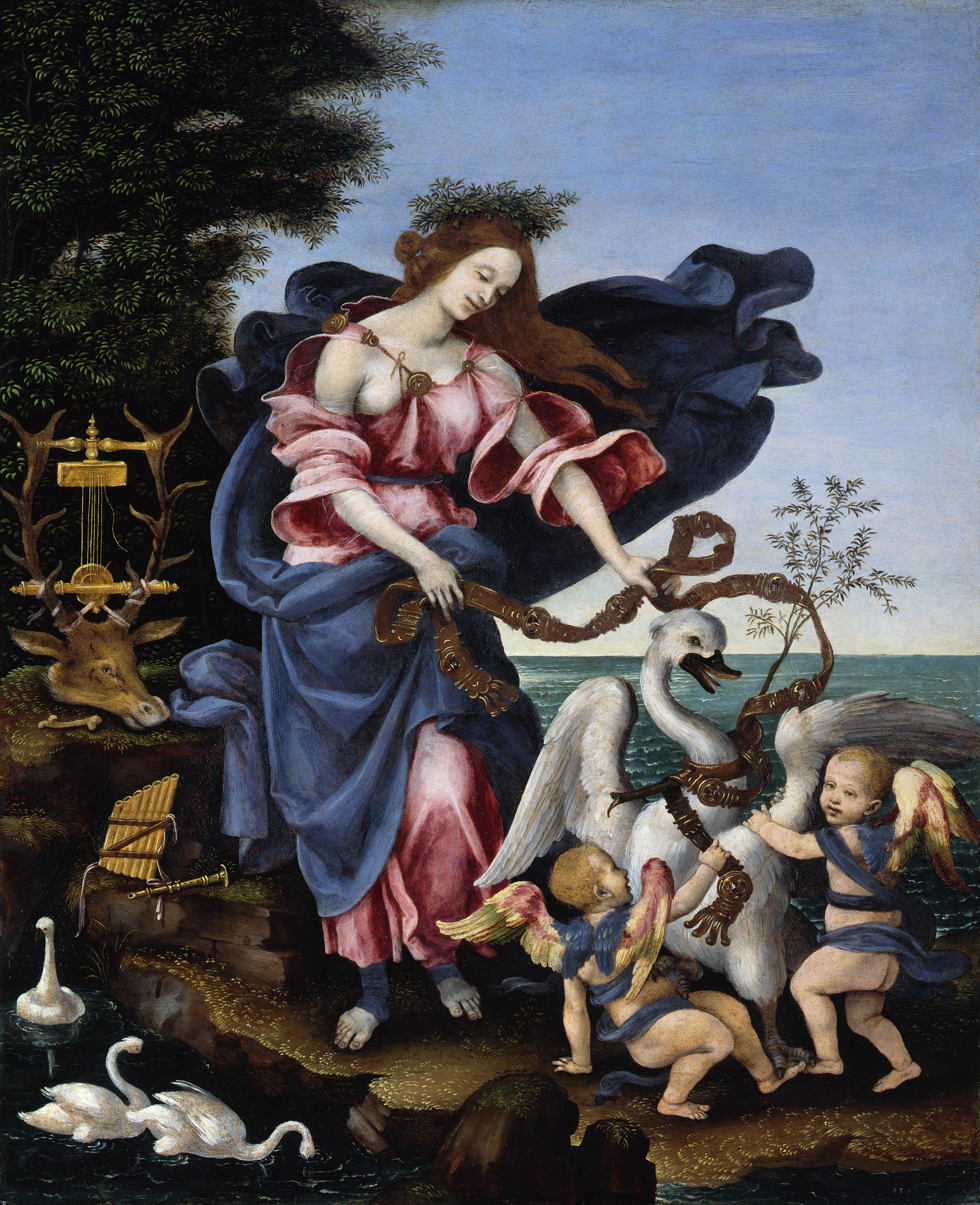
Allegory of Music (c. 1500), tempera on panel, 61 × 51 cm. Gemaldegalerie, Berlin, Germany

Filippino Lippi (probably 1457 – 18 April 1504) was an Italian Renaissance painter mostly working in Florence, Italy during the later years of the Early Renaissance and first few years of the High Renaissance. He also worked in Rome for a period from 1488, and later in the Milan area and Bologna.

He worked in oils, tempera and fresco, mostly painting religious subjects, with a few portraits and secular allegories or scenes from classical mythology.

== Biography ==
Filippino Lippi was born, probably in 1457, at Prato, Tuscany, the illegitimate son to Lucrezia Buti and the painter Fra Filippo Lippi. The couple had both broken vows of celibacy, and though after Filippino's birth they received a papal dispensation to marry (arranged by Lorenzo di Medici), Vasari says that they never did. Filippino's sister Alessandra was born in 1465.

Filippino first trained under his father in his workshop. They moved to Spoleto, where Filippino served as workshop assistant during the construction of Spoleto Cathedral. When his father died in 1469, Filippino was aged twelve and was among the assistants to his father who completed the frescoes with Storie della Vergine ("Life of the Virgin") in the cathedral.

Filippino later completed his apprenticeship in the workshop of Botticelli, who had been a pupil of Filippino's father. In the 1472 records of the Painters' guild it is noted that Botticelli had only Filippino Lippi as an assistant, and that he was living in his master's house. The two artists often worked together on the same project. The shared works include the panels belonging to a later dismantled pair of cassoni, the panels being now divided among the Louvre, the National Gallery of Canada, the Musée Condé in Chantilly, and the Galleria Pallavicini in Rome. Works by Botticelli and Filippino from these years include many paintings of the Madonna and Child which are often difficult to distinguish from one another.

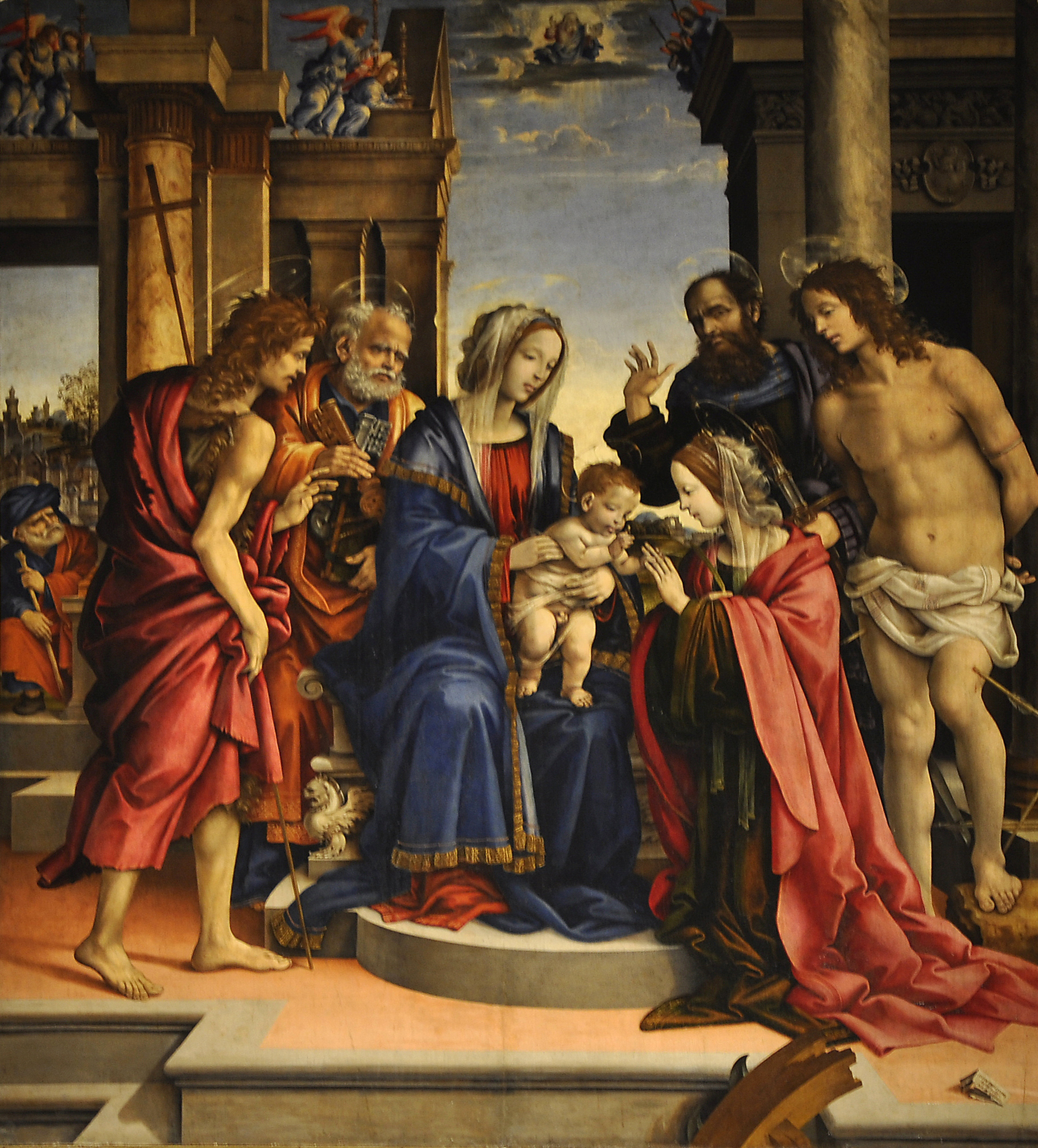
Mystic Wedding of St Catherine (1501) Basilica of San Domenico, Bologna, Italy

Filippino's early solo works greatly resemble those of Botticelli, but perhaps with less sensitivity and subtlety. The first ones (dating from 1475 onward) were attributed to an anonymous "Amico di Sandro" (i.e. "Friend of Botticelli"), a term introduced by Bernard Berenson in 1899, though by 30 years later Berenson's "lists" ascribed most of them to Lippi. Eventually Lippi's style evolved, becoming more personal and effective during the period 1480–1485. Works of this early period include: the Madonnas of Berlin, London, and Washington, D.C., the Journeys of Tobia of the Galleria Sabauda, Turin, the Madonna of the Sea of the Galleria dell'Accademia, Florence, and the Histories of Ester.

Together with Perugino (another pupil of his father), Ghirlandaio, and Botticelli, Filippino Lippi worked on the decoration of Lorenzo de' Medici's villa at Spedaletto. On 31 December 1482, he was commissioned to decorate a wall of the Sala dell'Udienza of the Palazzo Vecchio in Florence, a work never begun.

Soon after, probably in 1483–84, he was called to complete Masaccio's decoration of the Brancacci Chapel in the Santa Maria del Carmine di Firenze, that had been left unfinished when the artist died in 1428. There Filippino painted Stories of Saint Peter, in the following frescoes: Quarrel with Simon Magus in face of Nero, Resurrection of the Son of Teophilus, Saint Peter Jailed, Liberation, and Crucifixion of Saint Peter. Filippino's self-portrait at age twenty-five is at the right hand portion of the central panel, Disputation with Simon Magus and Crucifixion of St. Peter (see detail at info box).

Filippino Lippi's work on the Sala degli Otto di Pratica, in the Palazzo Vecchio, was completed on 20 February 1486. It is now in the Uffizi Gallery. At about this time, Piero di Francesco del Pugliese asked him to paint the altarpiece with the Apparition of the Virgin to St. Bernard, which is now in the Badia Fiorentina, Florence. This is Filippino Lippi's most popular painting: a composition of unreal items, with its very particular elongated figures, backed by a phantasmagorical scenario of rocks and almost anthropomorphic trunks. The work is dated to 1485–1487.

Later, Filippino worked for Tanai de' Nerli in Florence's Santo Spirito church.

On 21 April 1487, Filippo Strozzi asked him to decorate the Strozzi family chapel in Santa Maria Novella with Stories of St. John Evangelist and St. Philip. He worked on this commission on and off over a long time. He only completed it in 1503, after Strozzi's death. The windows with musical themes, in the same chapel, also designed by Filippino, were completed between June and July 1503. These paintings have been considered as influenced by the political and religious crisis in Florence at the time: the theme of the fresco, the clash between Christianity and Paganism, was hotly debated during those years and in connection with the friar Girolamo Savonarola.

Filippino depicted his characters in a landscape that recreated the ancient world in its finest details, showing the influence of the Grottesco style he had seen during his time in Rome. He created an "animated", mysterious, fantastic, but disquieting style, showing the unreality of nightmares. Thus, Filippino portrayed ruthless executioners with grim faces, who raged against the Saints. In the scene of St. Philip expelling a monster from the temple, the statue of the pagan deity is represented as a living figure challenging the Christian saint.

In 1488, now in his early thirties, Lippi went to Rome, where Lorenzo de' Medici had advised Cardinal Oliviero Carafa to entrust him with the decoration of the family chapel in Santa Maria sopra Minerva. The frescoes he produced there show a new inspiration, different from his earlier works, but confirm Lippi's continued research on the themes of the classical era. He completed the series by 1493.

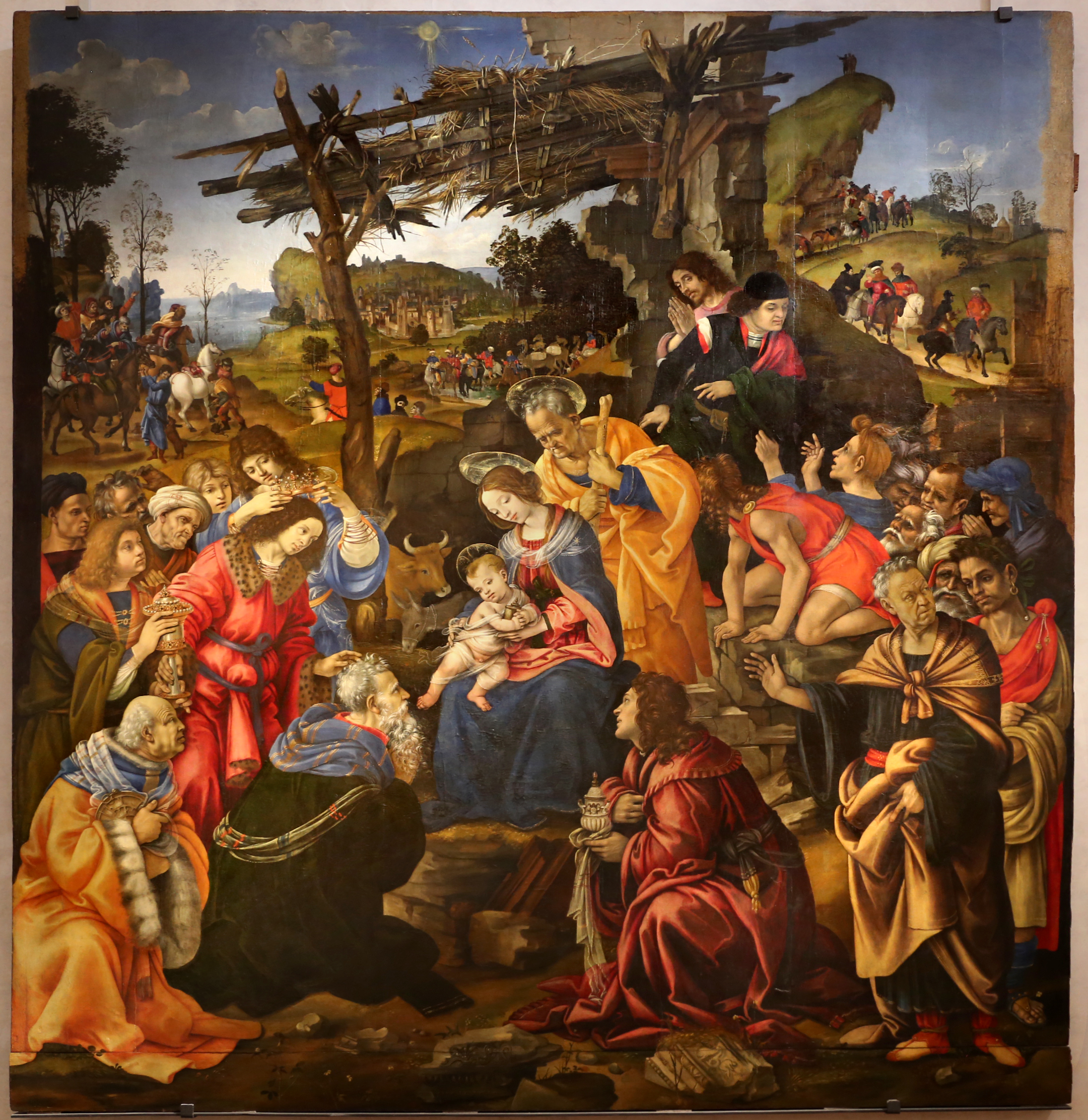
Adoration of the Magi (1496) tempera grassa on wood, Uffizi, Florence, Italy

Lippi returned to Florence some time between 1491 and 1494. Works of this period include: Apparition of Christ to the Virgin (c. 1493, now in Munich), Adoration of the Magi (1496, for the church of San Donato in Scopeto, now in the Uffizi), Sacrifice of Laocoön (end of the century, for the villa of Lorenzo de' Medici at Poggio a Caiano), St. John Baptist and Maddalena (Valori Chapel in San Procolo, Florence, inspired by the work of Luca Signorelli).

In addition Filippino worked away from his home town, at the Certosa di Pavia, a Carthusian monastery or Charterhouse located outside Pavia, and also in Prato, where, in 1503, he completed the Tabernacle of the Christmas Song, now in the City Museum. In 1501 Lippi painted the Mystic Wedding of St. Catherine for the Basilica of San Domenico in Bologna.

Lippi's final work was the Deposition for the Santissima Annunziata church in Florence, a work which was left unfinished at his death.

Filippino Lippi died on 18 April 1504, aged 47. It is a sign of his fame and reputation that on the day of his burial all the workshops of the city closed in his honor.

== Modern reception ==
The art critic Paul George Konody wrote of Lippi that "some of his qualities show him to be the most subtle psychologist of his time, the most modern in spirit of all the artists of the Renaissance".

== Major works ==
- Madonna with Child, St. Anthony of Padua and a Friar (before 1480)—Tempera on panel, 57 × 41.5 cm, Museum of Fine Arts, Budapest
- The Coronation of the Virgin (c. 1480)—Tempera on panel, 90.2 × 223 cm, National Gallery of Art, Washington, D.C.
- Tobias and the Angel (c. 1480)—Tempera on panel, 33 × 23 cm, National Gallery of Art, Washington, D.C.
- Three Angels with Young Tobias (1485)—Oil on panel, 100 × 127 cm, Galleria Sabauda, Turin
- Portrait of an Old Man (1485)—Detached fresco, 47 × 38 cm, Uffizi, Florence
- Self-portrait—Detached fresco on flat tile, 50 × 31 cm, Uffizi, Florence
- Portrait of a Youth (c. 1485)—Panel, 51 × 35.5 cm, National Gallery of Art, Washington, D.C.
- Signoria Altarpiece (Pala degli Otto) (1486)—Tempera on panel, 355 × 255 cm, Uffizi, Florence
- Apparition of the Virgin to St. Bernard (1486)—Oil on panel, 210 × 195 cm, Church of Badia, Florence
- Annunciation with St. Thomas and Cardinal Carafa (1488–1493)—Fresco, Santa Maria sopra Minerva, Rome
- Madonna with Child and Saints (c. 1488)—Oil on panel, Santo Spirito, Florence
- St. Jerome (1490s)—Oil on panel, 136 × 71 cm, Uffizi, Florence
- Apparition of Christ to the Virgin (c. 1493)—Oil on panel, 156.1 × 146.7 cm, Alte Pinakothek, Munich
- Adoration of the Magi (1496)—Oil on panel, Uffizi, Florence
- Madonna and Child with Saints (1498)—Fresco, 239 × 141 × 71 cm, Museo Civico, Prato
- Allegory (c. 1498)—Oil on panel, 29 × 22 cm, Uffizi, Florence
- Allegory of Music (Erato) (c. 1500)—Tempera on panel, 61 × 51 cm, Staatliche Museen, Berlin
- Crucifixion, c. 1501— tempera on panel, 31.2 × 23.4 cm, Museo Civico, Prato
- Mystic Marriage of St. Catherine (c. 1501–1503)—Panel, Basilica di San Domenico, Bologna
- Madonna and Child, St. Stefan and St. John the Baptist (1502–1503)—Tempera on panel, 132 × 118 cm, Museo Civico, Prato
- Deposition (1504, finished by Perugino in 1507)—Oil on panel, 333 × 218 cm, Galleria dell'Accademia, Florence

== School works ==
Following works are permitted to be cited as Filippino's school works.

- the Madonna, Child and St. John—tondo, Keglevich collection, Budapest,
- Cenacolo di S. Apollonia—Florence
- the Virgin giving her girdle to St. Thomas—Florence
- St. Anthony Abbot—Florence

== Gallery ==
Works and details

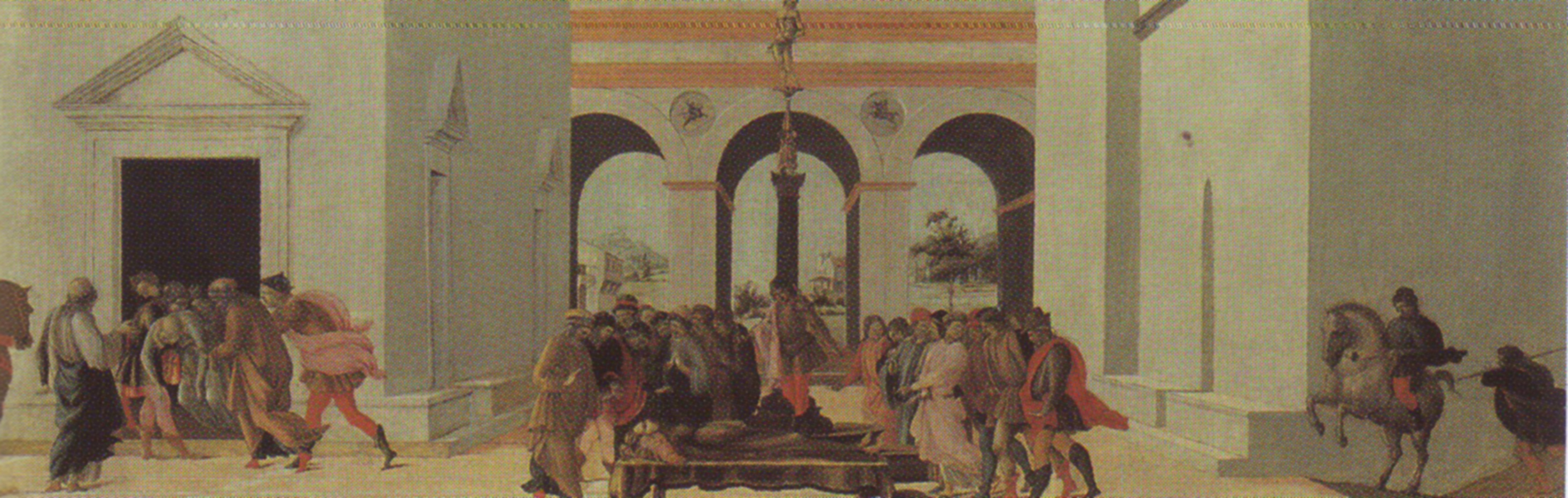
Death of Lucretia (1478–1480)

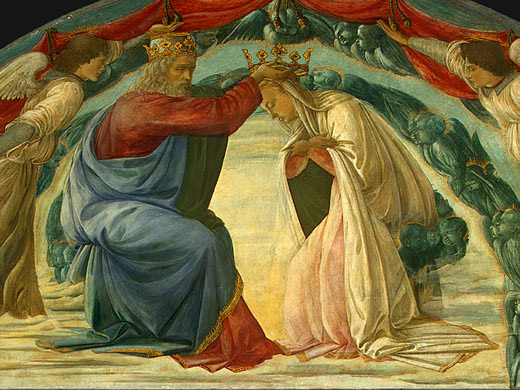
The Coronation of the Virgin (detail) (c. 1480)
Tempera on panel, 90.2 × 223 cm, National Gallery of Art, Washington, D.C.

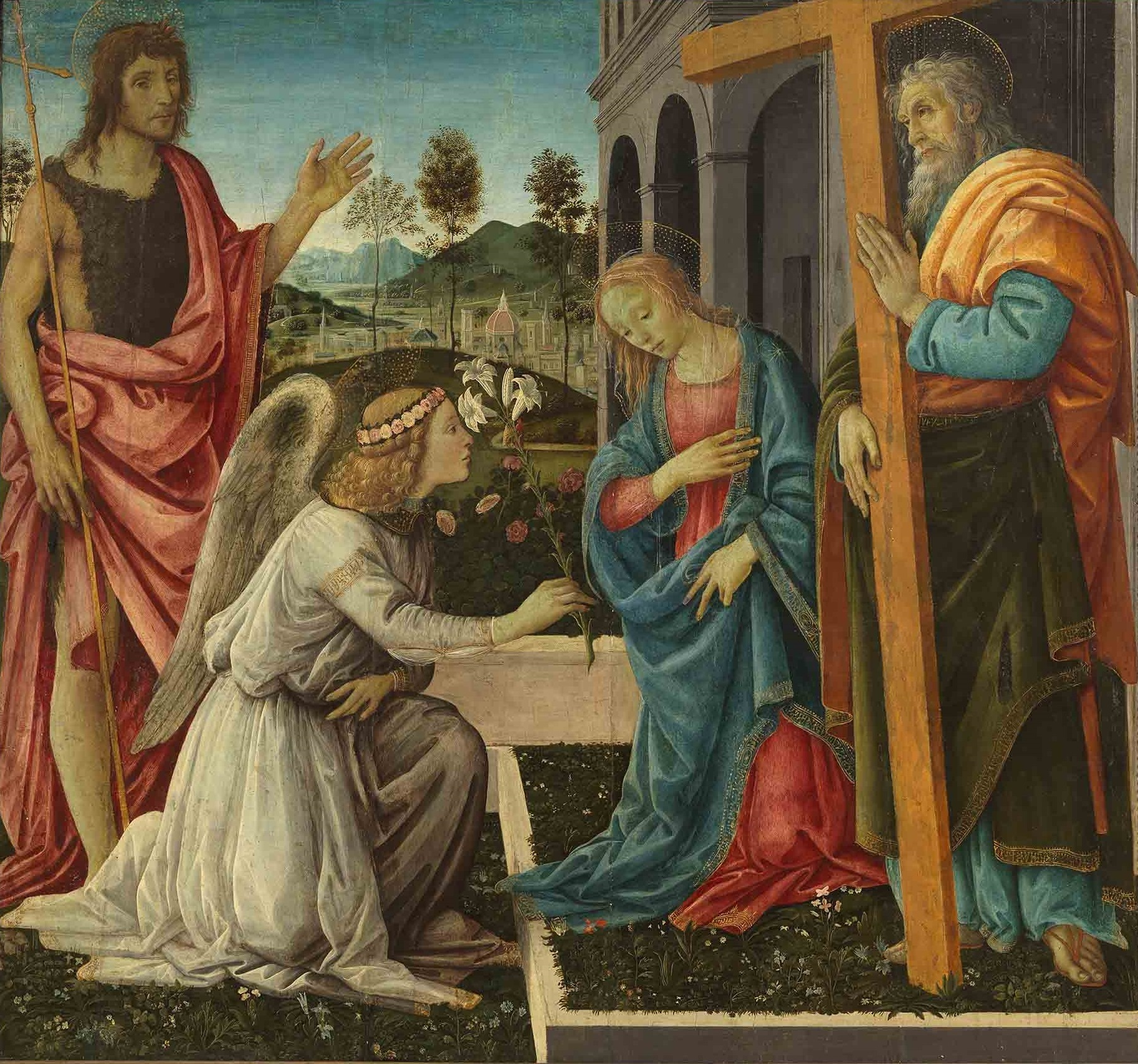
Annunciation with St. John the Baptist and St. Andrew, c. 1485

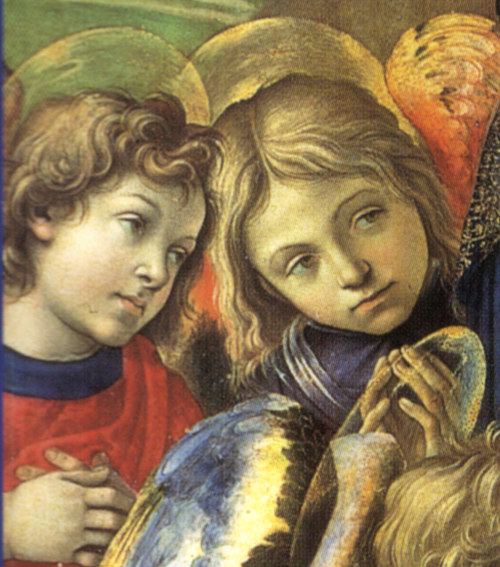
Apparition of the Virgin to St. Bernard (detail) (1486)
Oil on panel, 210 × 195 cm, Church of Badia, Florence

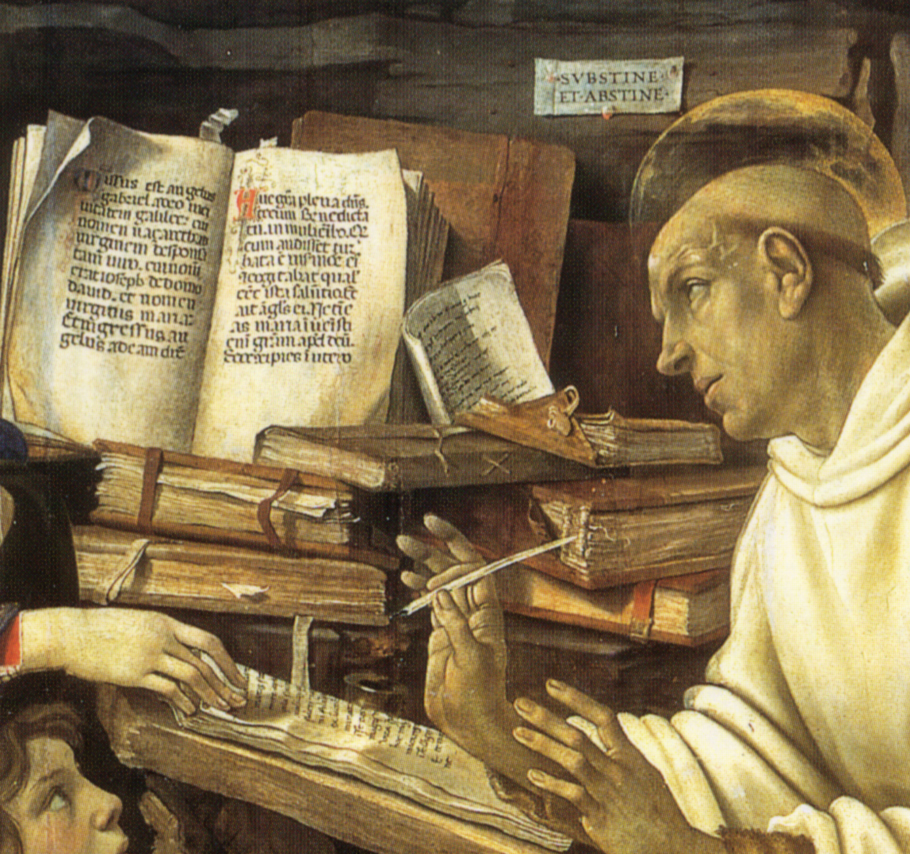
Apparition of the Virgin to St. Bernard (detail)

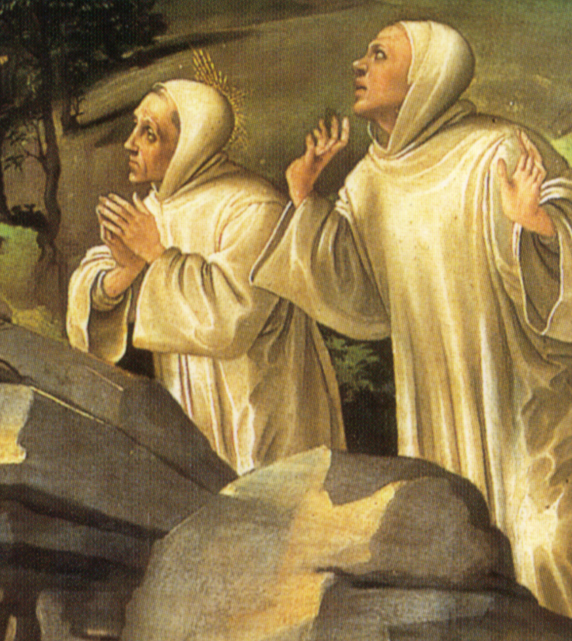
Apparition of the Virgin to St. Bernard (detail)

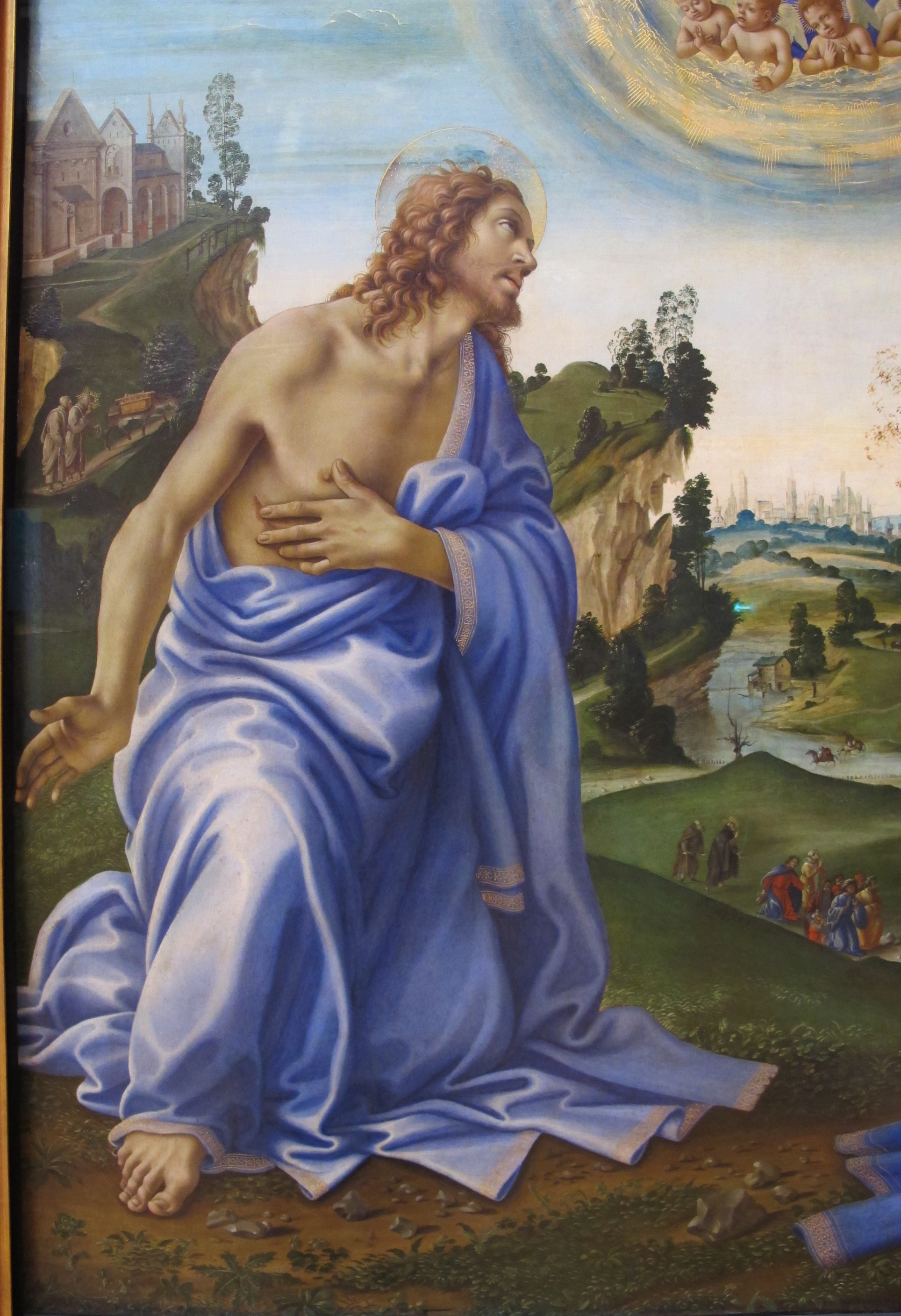
Apparition of Christ to the Virgin (c. 1493)
—Oil on panel, 156.1 × 146.7 cm, Alte Pinakothek, Munich

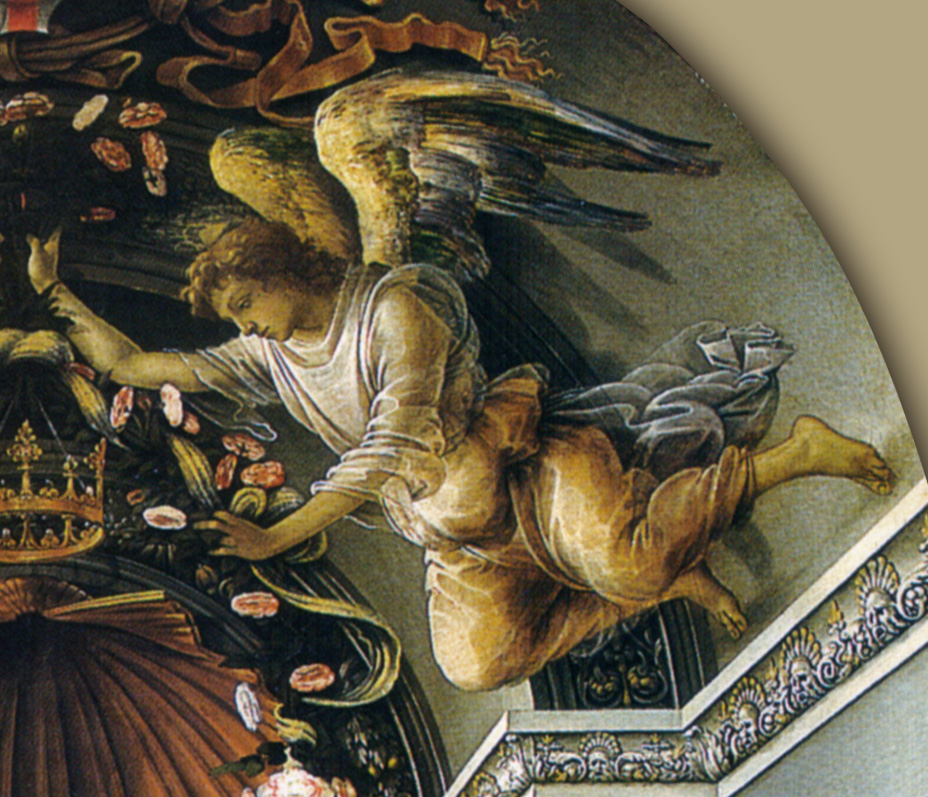
Angel (detail), Retábulo da Sala Degli Otto, Florence

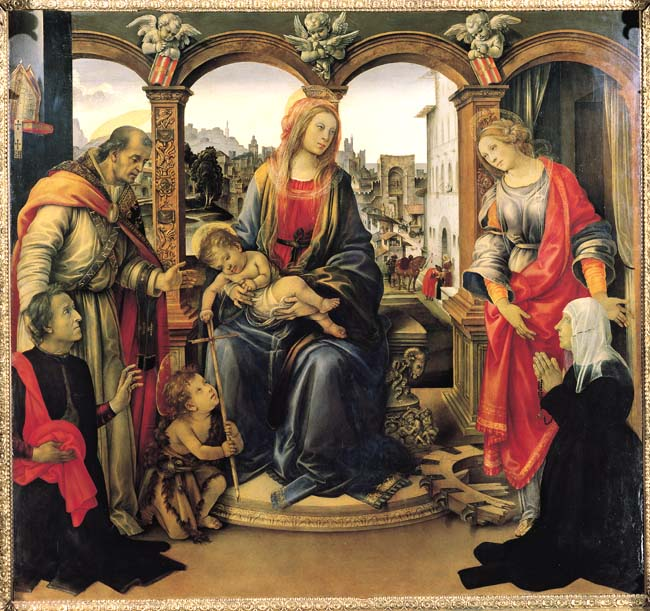
Madonna with Child and Saints (c. 1488)
Oil on wood, Santo Spirito, Florence

== See also ==
- Brancacci Chapel
- Carafa Chapel
- Strozzi Chapel

== Sources ==
- Davies, Martin, The Earlier Italian Schools, National Gallery Catalogues, 1961, reprinted 1986, ISBN 0901791296
- The Development of the Italian Schools of Painting, Volume 12, p. 371ff., Raimond van Marle, Hacker Art Books, New York 1970.
