= Ferrucci =

Ferrucci is an Italian surname. Notable people with the surname include:

- Andrea Ferrucci (1465–1526), Italian sculptor
- David Ferrucci
- Luigi Ferrucci, Italian geriatrician and epidemiologist
- Nicodemo Ferrucci (1574–1650), Italian Baroque painter
- Santino Ferrucci (born 1998), American Formula 2 Racing Driver
- Simone Ferrucci (1437–1493), Italian sculptor
- Simone di Nanni Ferrucci (1402-?), Italian sculptor

== See also ==
- Ferruccio
