= Ferruccio =

Ferruccio is an Italian given name derived from the Latin Ferrutio (the name of a 3rd-century Christian saint). It is also used as a surname. People with the name include:

== Given name ==
=== A–L ===
- Ferruccio Amendola (1930–2001), Italian actor
- Ferruccio Azzarini (1924–2005), Italian football player
- Ferruccio Bianchi, Italian racing driver
- Ferruccio Biancini (1890–1955), Italian actor
- Ferruccio Bonavia (1877–1950), Italian violinist, composer and musical critic
- Ferruccio Bortoluzzi (1920–2007), Italian modern painter
- Ferruccio Bruni (1899–1971), Italian athlete
- Ferruccio Busoni (1866–1924), Italian composer, pianist, music teacher and conductor
- Ferruccio Cerio (1904–1963), Italian film writer and director
- Ferruccio Diena, Italian football player
- Ferruccio Fazio (born 1944), Italian politician
- Ferruccio Ferrazzi (1891–1978), Italian painter and sculptor
- Ferruccio Furlanetto (born 1949), Italian bass-baritone
- Ferruccio Ghinaglia (1899–1921), founder and director of the Pavian Federation of the Italian Communist Party
- Ferruccio Ghidini (1912–?), Italian football player
- Ferruccio Giannini (1868–1948), Italian-American tenor, opera singer and theater director
- Ferruccio Lamborghini (1916–1993), Italian car maker
- Ferruccio Lamborghini (motorcyclist) (born 1991), Italian motorcycle racer
- Ferruccio Lantini (1886–1958), Italian politician

=== M–Z ===
- Ferruccio Manza (born 1943), Italian cyclist
- Ferruccio Mataresi (1928–2009), Italian artist
- Ferruccio Mazzola (1945–2013), Italian football player and manager
- Ferruccio Novo (1897–1974), Italian football (soccer) player, coach and club president
- Ferruccio Pagni (1866–1935), French-Italian painter
- Ferruccio Parri (1890–1981), Italian politician
- Ferruccio Pasqui (1886–1958), Italian painter
- Ferruccio Pisoni (1936–2020), Italian politician
- Ferruccio Ranza (1892–1973), Italian military officer
- Ferruccio Rontini (1893–1964), Italian painter
- Ferruccio Stefenelli (1898–1980), soldier and Italian diplomat
- Ferruccio Tagliavini (1913–1995), Italian tenor
- Ferruccio Dalla Torre (1931–1987), Italian bobsledder
- Ferruccio Valcareggi (1919–2005), Italian football player and coach
- Ferruccio Valobra (1898–1944), Italian politician
- Ferruccio Vitale (1875–1933), Italian architect
- Ferruccio Zambonini (1880–1932), Italian mineralogist and geologist
- Ferruccio Zanchi (born 2006), Italian professional Motocross racer

=== Middle name ===
- Giuseppe Ferruccio Saro (born 1951), Italian politician

== Surname ==
- Francesco Ferruccio (1489–1530), Florentine captain

== See also ==
- Ferrucci
