= Ghidini =

Ghidini is an Italian surname. Notable people with the surname include:

- Ferruccio Ghidini (1912–1994), Italian footballer
- Gérard Ghidini (1943–2012), French slalom canoeist
- Gianni Ghidini (1930–1995), Italian cyclist

== See also ==
- Ghedini
