= Fernando Previtali =

Italian conductor (1907 - 1985)

- Fernando Previtali (photo with 1959 dedication)
- Occupation: conductor

Fernando Previtali (16 February 1907 in Adria, Italy – 1 August 1985 in Rome, Italy) was an Italian conductor, particularly associated with the Italian repertory, especially Verdi operas.

He studied at the Giuseppe Verdi Music Conservatory in Turin, and later with Franco Alfano. He began his career as assistant conductor to Vittorio Gui in Florence from 1928 to 1935, and later in Genoa from 1935 to 1936.

He was artistic director of the RAI National Symphony Orchestra from 1936 until 1953, and conducted the Verdi cycle in 1951, to commemorate the composer's 50th death anniversary, and left recordings of Nabucco, Ernani, La battaglia di Legnano, Il trovatore, and Don Carlo. His recorded legacy of opera also includes a distinguished production of Amilcare Ponchielli's La Gioconda. He conducted at all the major opera houses of Italy, and was principal conductor at the Teatro Colón in Buenos Aires in the 1960s. He was appointed artistic director of the Teatro Regio in Turin in 1970, and later of the Teatro Comunale in Genoa.

He conducted the first performances of Dallapiccola's Volo di notte and Ghedini's Rè Hassan and Le Baccanti.

His students included the British conductor Meredith Davies.
