= Bernardo Rossellino =

Italian sculptor (1409–1464)

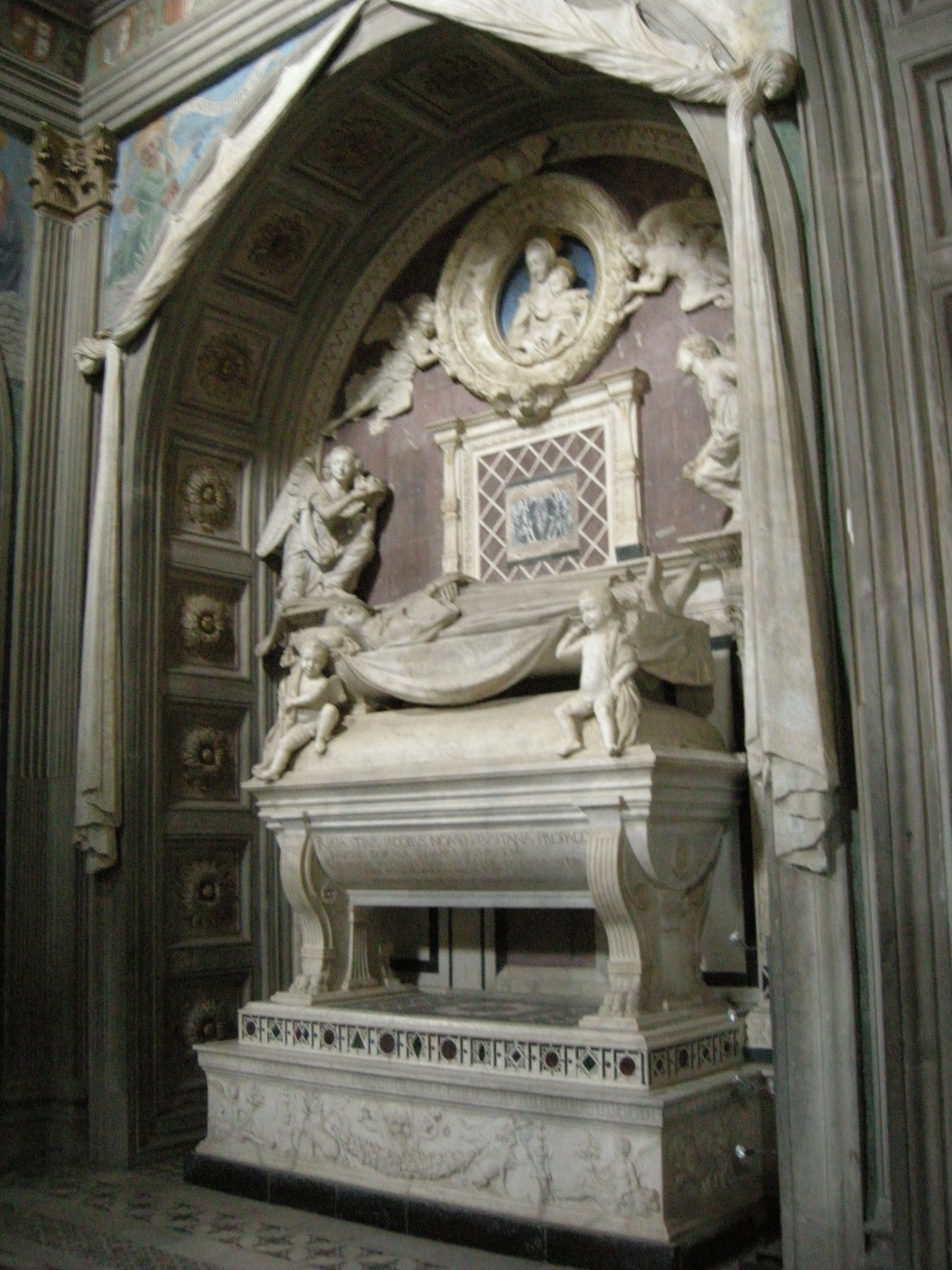
Rossellino's Tomb of the Cardinal of Portugal, Florence

Bernardo di Matteo del Borra Gamberelli (1409–1464), better known as Bernardo Rossellino, was an Italian Renaissance sculptor and architect, the elder brother of the sculptor Antonio Rossellino. As a member of the second generation of Renaissance artists, he helped to further define and popularize the revolution in artistic approach that characterized the new age. His work is often hard to distinguish from that of his brothers (three in all) working in the family workshop.

== Biography ==
Rossellino was born into a family of farmers and quarry owners in the mountain village of Settignano, Italy, overlooking the Arno Valley and the city of Florence. His uncle, Jacopo di Domenico di Luca del Borra Gamberelli may have given him his first lessons in stonemasonry. By 1420, Bernardo was certainly down in Florence and apprenticed to one of that city's better-known sculptors, perhaps Nanni di Bartolo, called "il Rosso (the redhead)". Such a relationship might explain the nickname of "Rossellino (the little redhead) given to Bernardo and applied to his brothers, Antonio, Domenico, and Giovanni. Curiously, there is no record of Bernardo's entry into Florence's Guild of Stone and Woodworkers, although matriculation information exists for his brothers.

Bernardo learned from the experimental atmosphere that suffused Florence in the 1420s. He seems to have been captivated by the "new wave" approaches being put into practice by Brunelleschi, Donatello, Ghiberti, and Masaccio. Bernardo Rossellino embraced and held true to the classical revival in both sculpture and architecture. Celebrated for his sculpture (the Leonardo Bruni Tomb, Empoli Annunciation group), he achieved particular distinction through his expanding role as an architect, achieving lasting fame for the work done or planned in Rome for Pope Nicholas V and, especially for the rebuilding of the town of Pienza for Pope Pius II. Part of his artistic importance also lay in his entrepreneurial skills which enabled him to assemble a large and successful workshop that dominated the stoneworking field in Florence during the 1450s and 1460s.

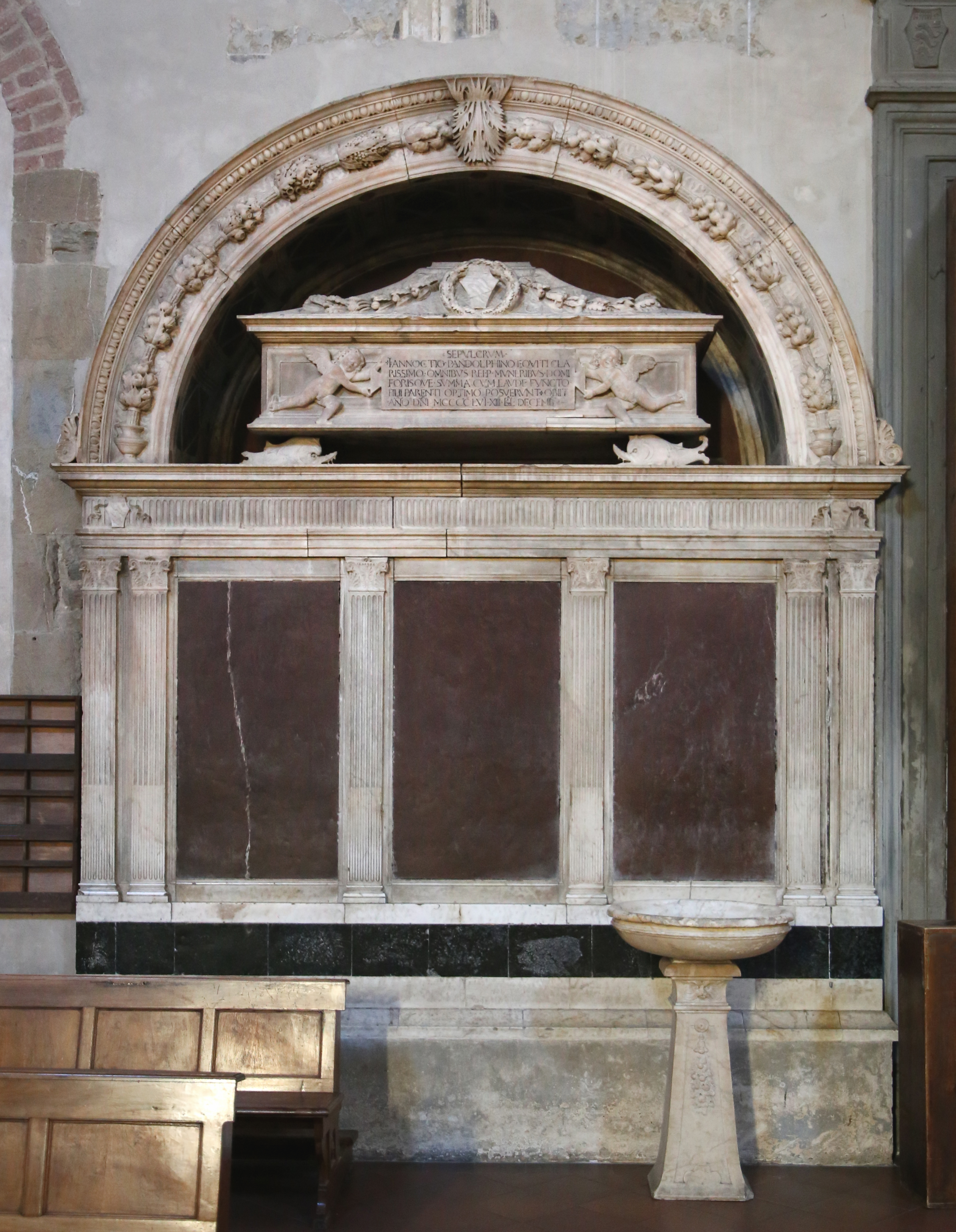
Monument to Giannozzo Pandolfini, Badia Fiorentina, Florence

=== Arezzo, 1433 ===
In 1433, Bernardo is recorded as being in Arezzo, employed by the Fraternita di Santa Maria della Misericordia to complete the facade of the Misericordia's headquarters. His first job presented a considerable challenge. The lower storey of this palace had been completed a half century earlier in the, then, popular Gothic style. Thus the problem confronting Bernardo was similar to that which Alberti encountered a quarter century later when asked to complete the facade of Santa Maria Novella. Bernardo's solution for the unfinished second storey was a three bay design which used a typically Gothic mixed-element frame in the central bay flanked by classical paired pilasters and aediculae, the features of which were taken from the most progressive sources available. Set within the Gothic frame of this second storey is a relief of the Madonna of Mercy, the protectress of Arezzo, spreading her mantle out over the community's citizenry. She is flanked by the kneeling saints Laurentius and Persentinus. Bernardo received his final payment for the project in June 1435, specifically for the two free standing figures of Saints Gregory and Donatus which occupy the aediculae on either side of the Misericordia relief. Rossellino's solution for the Arezzo palace facade fused Gothic and Renaissance elements in a deft, if somewhat awkward, combination aimed at achieving the Renaissance goal of unified harmony. He also clearly displayed, in this initial effort at both sculpture and architecture, a genius for the sort of creative eclecticism that became a major feature of the "Rossellino manner".

=== Return to Florence, from 1436 ===
Bernardo Rossellino was back in Florence in 1436 to establish his own workshop and to join a crew of stonemasons already at work constructing the Aranci Cloister of the Badia. Payment records, supported by stylistic evidence, indicate that his principal contributions (1436–38) to this project included a handsome stone doorframe and an unusual cross window, both of which are identifiable today. It also is possible that he proposed the addition of the pilaster strips which divide the surfaces of the loggias of the two-storey courtyard into a systematic grid. Documents indicate that Bernardo assumed a more decisive role at the suburban monastery of Santa Maria alle Campora whose cloister (1436) challenges that of Michelozzo at San Marco as the first such structure to have been erected in accordance with a Renaissance aesthetic. In 1444, he received a commission to sculpt two altar figures for the oratory of the Annunciation in the church of St. Stephen in Empoli. In these two representations of the Virgin Annunciate and of the Archangel Gabriel, we find a further development of the artist's decoratively graceful and classical style as well as a recognition of the sculptural styles of Donatello, Ghiberti, and Michelozzo.

Although the primary merchandise of the Rossellino shop was the supply of building material and simple tasks of stonemasonry, there were several projects combining sculptural and architectural features that were of particular significance during the 1440s. One, undertaken in the Palazzo Pubblico of Siena, called upon Rossellino to design a grand entry way into the Sala del Concistoro.

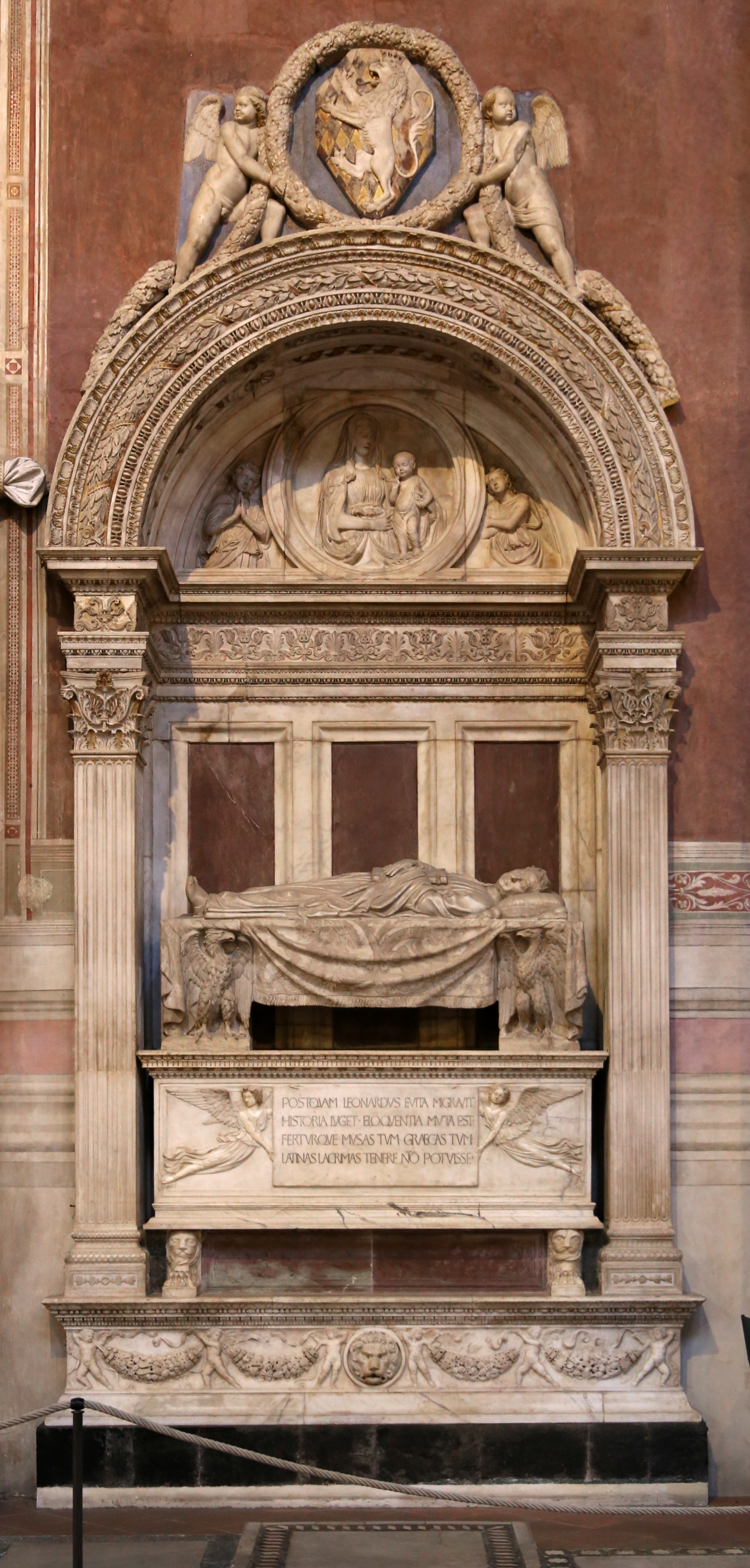
Tomb of Leonardo Bruni (died 1444), Santa Croce, Florence

Another project was the triumphal arch wall tomb erected in Florence's church of Santa Croce for the historian and humanist scholar Leonardo Bruni (died 1444), who had served as the State Chancellor of Florence. No documentation survives for the tomb, but two early 16th-century sources credit Bernardo Rossellino for the project and his authorship generally has been accepted. There, however, has been debate concerning the dating of the tomb, with some supporting a date in the late 1440s and others, believing that Bernardo could not have conceived its classical character prior to his stay in Rome, preferring a date after 1455. There is, however, nothing in its design that would preclude the earlier dating. In fact the Bruni Tomb seems a logical continuation of the classicizing manner which Bernardo recently had displayed in his design for the Concistoro door frame in Siena. Accordingly, the Bruni Tomb might best be dated to the years 1446–48.

Bernardo Rossellino's Bruni Tomb consisted of a shallow wall niche framed by pilasters and topped by a semi-circular arch. The effect suggests a triumphal arch leading to both the immortal fame desired by the humanist scholar and spiritual deliverance sought by the pious Christian. Bruni's sarcophagus is placed within the niche and it, in turn, supports a brocade-draped bier upon which rests Bernardo's portrait effigy of the statesman. A tondo containing the Madonna and Child flanked by half-length angels appears within the arch above the bier, while two large angelic putti, bearing Bruni's coat-of-arms ascend the archivolt. Bernardo drew upon a variety of sources in arriving at his design for the tomb, including 14th-century wall tombs in Rome done by members of the so-called Cosmati school, as well as the recently executed Tomb of Baldassare Coscia (Antipope John XXIII) by Donatello and the Brancacci tomb by Michelozzo. What sets the Bruni tomb apart and established it as the "standard" upon which so many subsequent later Renaissance tombs were based (including that for Carlo Marsuppini executed a few years later for Santa Croce by Bernardo's probable pupil, Desiderio da Settignano) was its sense of unity.

By any estimation, these two works (the Siena portal and the Bruni Tomb) stand out as highpoints in the evolution of the Renaissance style. Even before his trip to Rome in the 1450s and his contact with Alberti, Bernardo demonstrated a thorough appreciation for the nature of the antique revival that was so fundamental to the Renaissance movement. His understanding of the essential elements of antiquity is also apparent in the finest architectural achievement of Bernardo's early years, the Spinelli Cloister at Santa Croce in Florence (1448–51). No documents exist to connect Bernardo with this project but the entry portal is clearly a simplified version of his Siena door frame and his authorship of the Spinelli Cloister may be accepted. The rhythmic beauty of the cloister, perhaps the loveliest of the early Renaissance, is due to a carefully formulated series of mathematical ratios and Euclidean relationships that echo those employed by Brunelleschi at the Hospital of the Innocents. The crisply executed architectural sculptures of the Spinelli Cloister (doorframes, capitals and corbels, entry portal) are stylistic signatures of the "Rossellino manner" and are unique to his workshop. Bernardo's style is also to be found in the tabernacle he executed (1449–51) for the Florentine church of Santa Maria Nuova (since relocated to Sant'Egidio). In 1451, his shop received an important sculptural commission for a tomb for the Beata Villana in Santa Maria Novella (now dismembered and in fragmentary state). Its execution was left in the hands of Bernardo's brother, Antonio and other members of the workshop (including Desiderio da Settignano) due to Bernardo's departure for Rome.

During these same years, Bernardo was employed by the wealthy banker Giovanni Rucellai to remodel several old dwellings into a new family palace. This initial work for Rucellai involved internal systemization, the construction of a cross-vaulted passage leading from the street (the Via della Vigna nuova) to a new courtyard and loggia for which he also was responsible. Evidence of Bernardo's presence may found in one of the corbels in this corridor which is identical to those used in the Spinelli Cloister and was a probable "leftover" from that project.

=== Rome, 1451–55 ===
Bernardo's career took an important turn when he traveled to Rome in 1451 to join the vast architectural team then engaged by Pope Nicholas V to revitalize the ancient city and its environs. Giorgio Vasari's mid-sixteenth century biography of the artist greatly exaggerated Bernardo's actual role in most of the projects. Although his retainer exceeded that of all other stonemasons in the papal employ, he is documented at only two projects: as furnishing hoists for the large round tower at the Vatican Palace and in doing restoration work at the early Christian church of San Stefano Rotondo (window and door frames, vaulting, stone paving). His primary task in Rome, apparently, was to draw up plans, likely under the supervision of Alberti, for rebuilding the Vatican and the Basilica of St. Peter's, projects which, due to the death of the pope in 1455, were never carried out. In spite of this, Bernardo's long sojourn in Rome had significant meaning for him, solidifying his commitment to reviving the spirit of antiquity in his works and exposing him to the concepts of Alberti.

During Bernardo's long absence his workshop had been left in the talented hands of Antonio Rossellino, together with his other brothers, Domenico and Giovanni, all of whom concentrated upon the sculptural side of the stonemasonry business. Once back in Florence, Bernardo assumed his oversight of the workshop's production but increasingly turned his attention to more lucrative architectural matters. Thus, those sculptural projects often associated with the Rossellino name such as the tombs for Giovanni Chelini in San Domenico, San Miniato al Tedesco, for the Beato Lorenzo da Ripafrata and for Filippo Lazzari, both in San Domenico, Pistoia, for Geminiano Inghirami in San Francesco, Prato, and for the Beato Marcolino, San Giacomo, Forlì, likely involved only his overall approval and not his chisel. This probably also was the case with the mortuary chapel and tomb monument for Cardinal James of Portugal constructed at the Florentine church of San Miniato al Monte which, in its multiplicity of artistic elements and multi-media impact, seems to predict the Baroque (i.e., Bernini's Cornaro Chapel). His involvement with the Tomb of Orlando de' Medici in Santissima Annunziata was more personal but its conception is more architectural than sculptural.

Among those Florentine building projects with which Bernardo was involved in this last phase of his career was the amalgamation of several buildings into a palace for his former patron at the Santa Croce monastery, Tomasso Spinelli. The unifying facade of the Spinelli Palace utilized the cost-saving technique of faux stonework incised into plaster but the entry corridor is remarkable for its use of illusionary perspective.

Bernardo also returned to Giovanni Rucellai's palace to apply a unifying front of stonework to its public face along the Via Vigna Nuova. It is this facade, divided into bays by three tiers of classically inspired pilasters rising above a base of mock stonework opus quadratum and topped by an abbreviated entablature, that sets this building apart from all other Florentine townhouses. While there is evidence pointing to Bernardo's involvement in constructing the Rucellai facade, the name of Alberti has most usually been connected with its design. In any case, Bernardo Rossellino's artistic prominence was recognized when he was appointed capomaestro (chief architect) of the Florence Cathedral in 1461 (by that time, largely an honorific title).

=== Pienza, 1459–61 ===
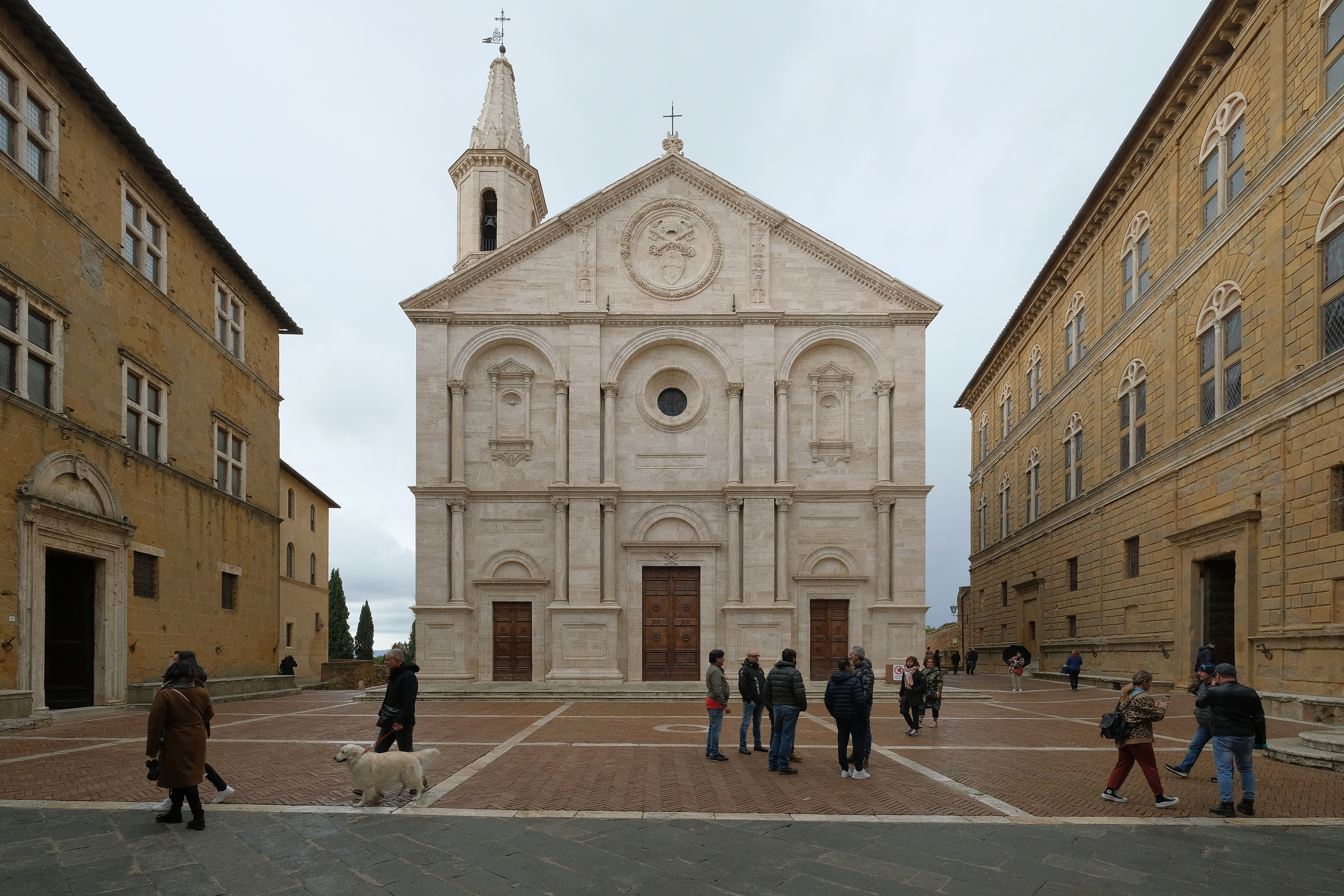
Façade of the Cathedral of Pienza

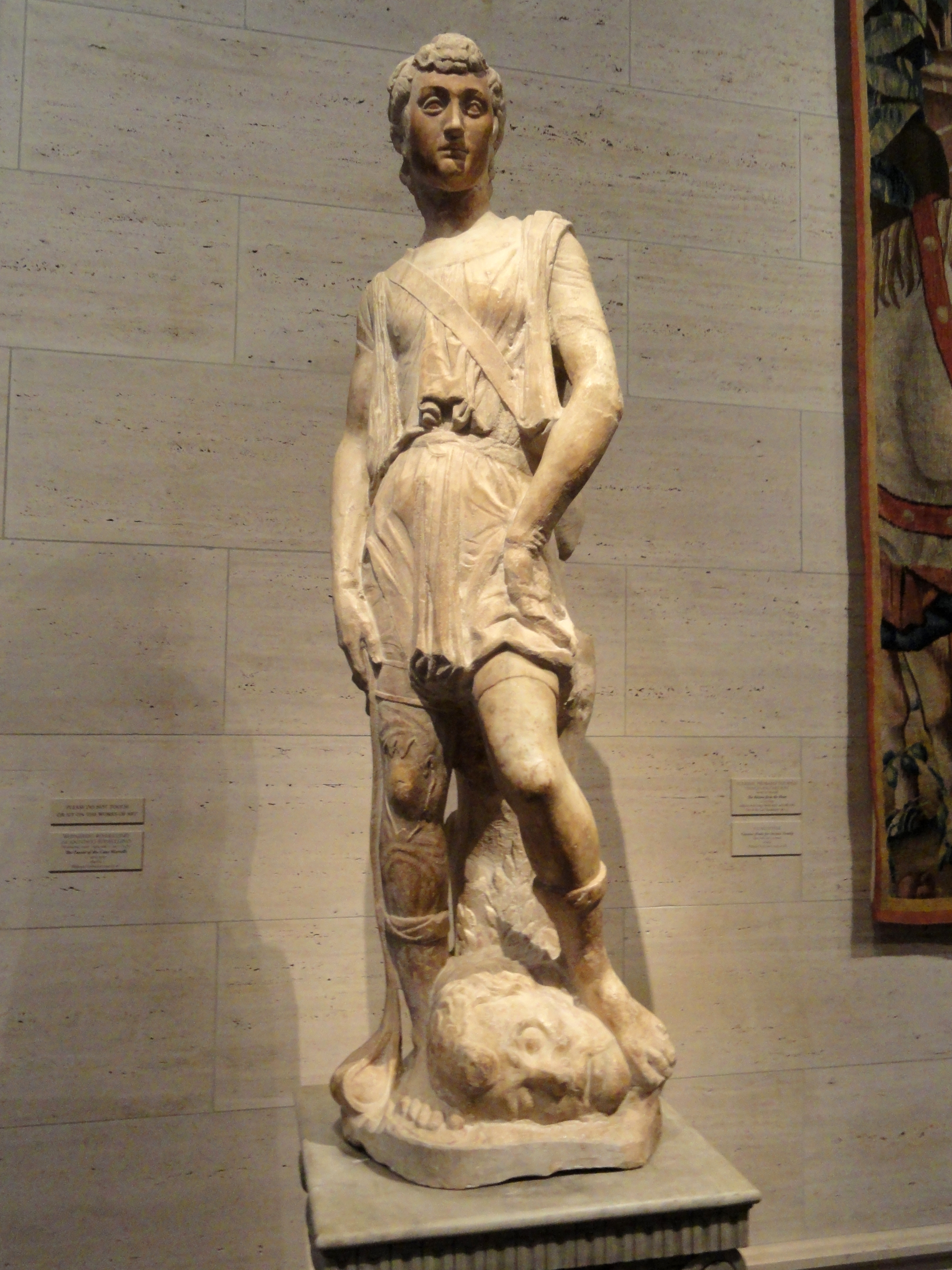
David of the Casa Martelli by Bernardo Rossellino or Antonio Rossellino, c. 1461–1479, marble

Despite his previous accomplishments, the true measure of Bernardo Rossellino's architectural place in history lies in the extraordinary project he undertook for Pope Pius II at Pienza between 1459 and 1464. There, in a sweeping transformation of a rural community, Bernardo erected an imposing family palace, a grand cathedral, town hall, bishop's palace and canons' house, all set compactly about a trapezoidal square and bringing together the architectural tastes of Florence, Siena, and Rome. He also supervised the construction or renovation of palaces and townhouses for several cardinals and members of the papal court, and a quantity of houses for the citizens of this transformed community. For the Piccolomini Palace, a massive three-storey block set about a spacious courtyard, he designed three articulated facades resembling the front of the Rucellai palace (which the Piccolomini Palace may well predate) and opened up a garden front of three tiers of loggias from which a splendid panorama might be viewed.

At Pienza Cathedral he affixed a classicizing exterior to a Teutonic "hall church" within the cathedral, the elegant Altar of St. Andrew and the ornate baptismal font in the lower church serve as reminders of the continuing sculptural output Bernardo's Florentine workshop. The real significance of Pienza, however, lies not in the merits of the individual units, but in Bernardo Rossellino's ability to see the various projects as an urban totality. The trapezoidal, or Quattrocento form would later influence architect Michelangelo in his grand renovation of the piazza del campidoglio in Rome. The inspiration for Pienza may have come from the Albertian atmosphere of his earlier experience in Rome. While other architects of the Early Renaissance were forced to deal with townplanning on a theoretical basis, Bernardo was given the rare opportunity to actually put his ideas into practice. The result was one of the most pleasing and harmonious cityscapes in the history of urban design.

Final projects included designs for the Piccolomini-Todeschini Palace in Siena, a bell tower for the church of San Pietro in Perugia (modeled after that in Pienza), and possibly for the Piccolomini Palace built alongside the thermal pool at Bagno di Vignoni.

Bernardo died in Florence on 23 September 1464. His pupils/assistants included his younger brother Antonio, Desiderio da Settignano, Matteo Civitale, Buggiano, Mino da Fiesole. The workshop continued under the leadership of Antonio but accepted only commissions for sculpture.
