= Desiderio da Settignano =

Italian sculptor (c. 1428/30–1464)

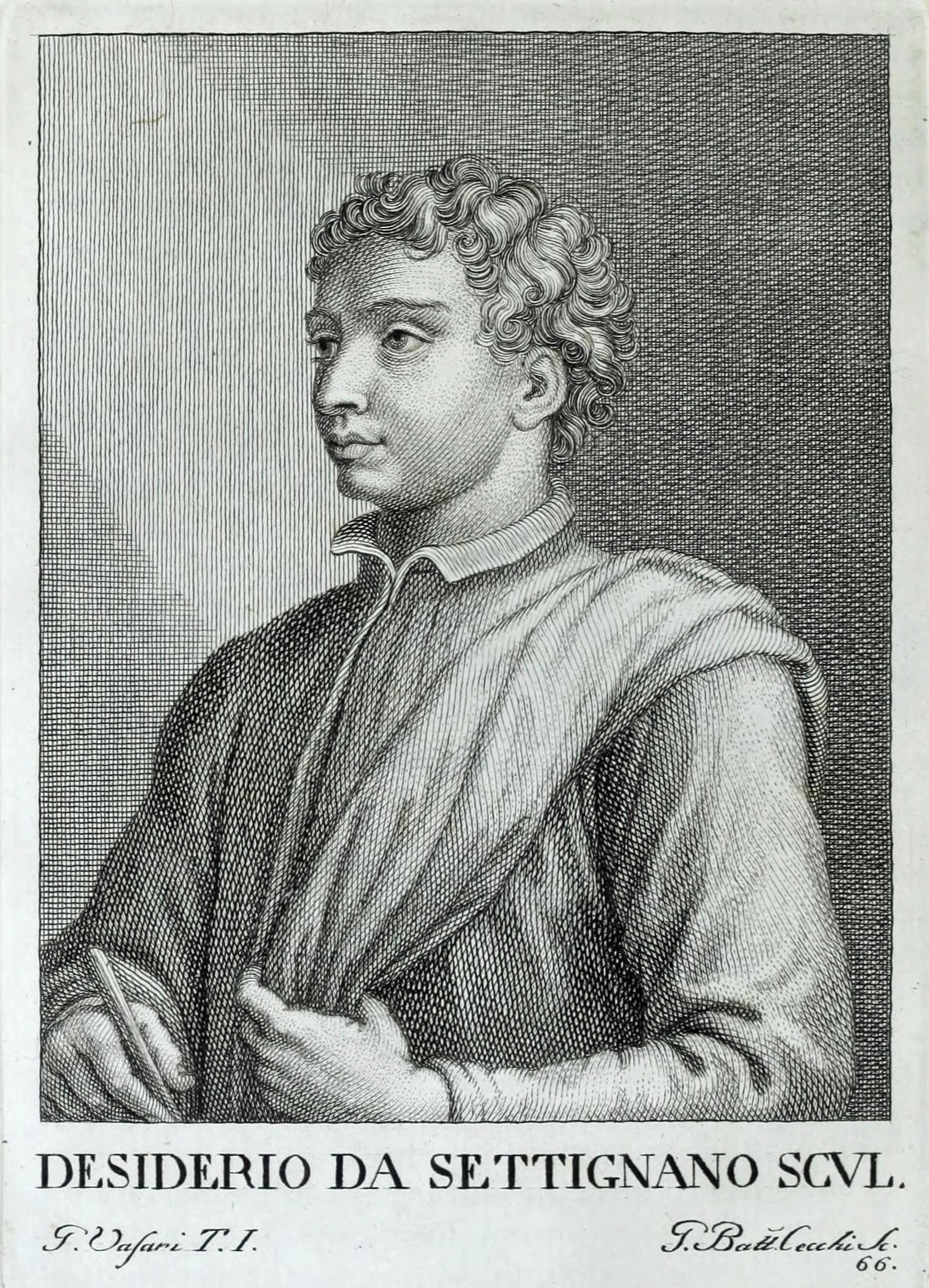
Imaginary portrait of Desiderio da Settignano for Vasari's Vite

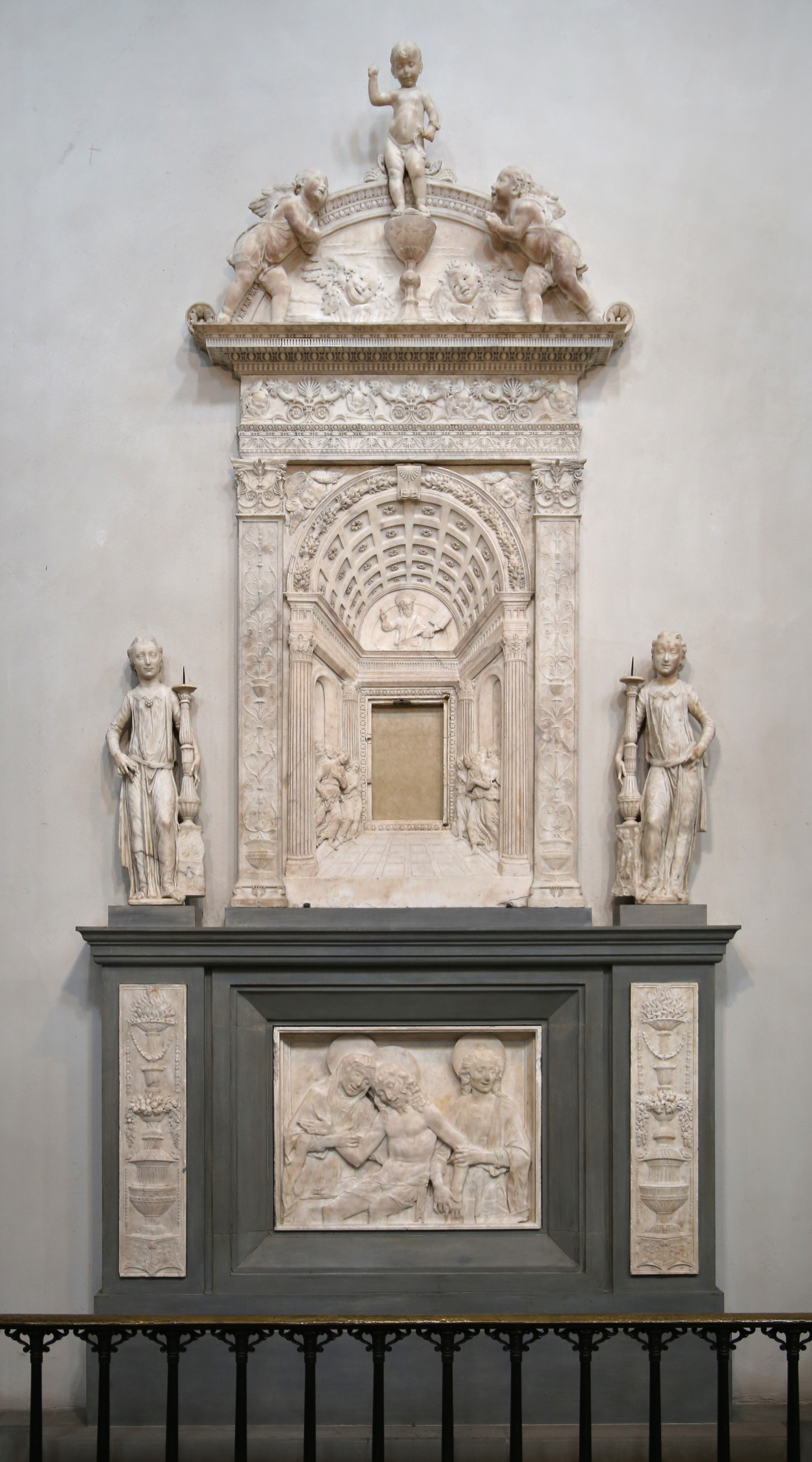
Tabernacle, 1460–64, San Lorenzo, Florence

Desiderio da Settignano, real name Desiderio de Bartolomeo di Francesco detto Ferro (c. 1428 or 1430 – 1464) was an Italian Renaissance sculptor active in north Italy.

== Biography ==
He came from a family of stone carvers and stonemasons in Settignano, near Florence. Although his work shows the influence of Donatello, specifically in his use of low reliefs, it is most likely that he received his training in the large Florentine workshop run by Bernardo and Antonio Rossellino. Desiderio matriculated into the Arte dei Maestri di Pietra e Legname, Florence's guild of Stone and Woodworkers, in 1453 and shortly thereafter already was supplying cherub head medallions for the frieze running across the front of the Pazzi Chapel in the second cloisteryard of the Basilica of Santa Croce. ex

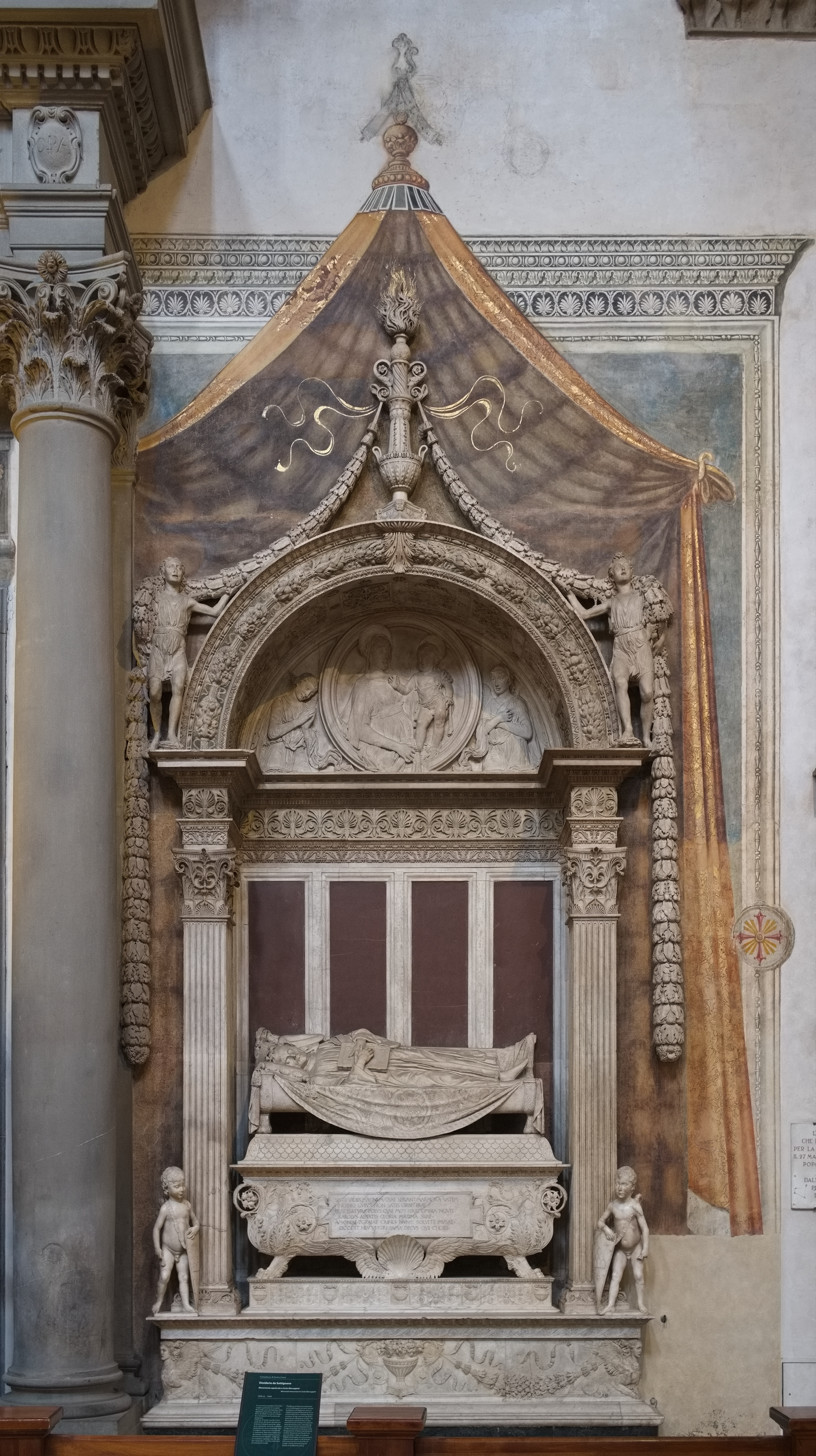
Memorial Tomb for Carlo Marsuppini, 1453–55, Santa Croce, Florence

=== Memorial Tomb for Carlo Marsuppini ===
It is rather surprising that he would have received such an important commission as the monumental tomb of Carlo Marsuppini so early in his career. Apparently, his design capabilities and sensitivity to the tactile qualities of marble had already been recognized. In composing this wall tomb for the Basilica of Santa Croce, Desiderio relied upon the precedent set only a few years earlier in Bernardo Rossellino's Memorial Tomb of Leonardo Bruni. This seems quite appropriate since Marsuppini had succeeded Bruni in the position of Florentine State Chancellor and had been mentored by him just as Desiderio had received his training from Bernardo Rossellini. In fact, in his design for the tomb, Desiderio was paying homage to Bernardo's example in much the same fashion as Marsuppini did when he had composed the epitaph for the Bruni tomb. Desiderio took over the essential compositional scheme of an elevated triumphal arch containing a sarcophagus and effigy bier from the Bruni monument but transformed the sobriety of the earlier memorial into a work of heightened decorative fancy. In the Marsuppini tomb, Desiderio placed standing children holding heraldic shields on either side of the sarcophagus, draped long festoons from an ornate candelabra which surmounts the arch of the lunette, and positioned running youths above the pilasters which frame the funeral niche.

In the niche itself, he ignored the symbolism of the Trinity by using four instead of three panels as the backdrop for the sarcophagus. To increase the visibility of the deceased scholar and statesman, he tilted Marsuppini's effigy forward toward the viewer and carved elaborate floral decorations on the rounded corners of the lion-footed sarcophagus. The motifs used are all somewhat classical in inspiration and the total effect is light and charming, even joyous, if somewhat unfocused.^{Ref missing.}

=== Tabernacle of the Sacrament ===
In 1461 (or 1460–1464) he finished a tabernacle intended for installation either in the Sacrament Chapel in San Lorenzo, dedicated to the Medici family saints, Cosmas and Damian, located in the left transept of the church; or, more likely, it was first installed in the main chapel choir.

For his Tabernacle of the Sacrament, Desiderio returned (as he had done earlier for the Marsuppini Tomb) to a prototype originated by his probable master, Bernardo Rossellino. This time, Desiderio found his inspiration in Rossellino's c. 1450 tabernacle for the chapel in the St Giles church of the Women's Hospital of Santa Maria Nuova. What Desiderio produced is unquestionably one of the most decoratively delightful examples of early Renaissance sculpture. The composition consists of a pilaster framed aedicula within which a spatially receding barrel vault leads the eye back to the actual doorway of the sacramental closet.

In the lunette above is a half-length figure of God/Christ energetically displaying an open book in reference to Revelations 1:8: "I am the Alpha and the Omega; the beginning and the ending, saith the Lord." Halfway down this illusionary corridor, angels rush in from side passages, their draperies fluttering with the pictorial excitement of Fra Filippo Lippi.

The aedicula of the tabernacle is surmounted by an elaborately framed lunette that encloses an image of the blessing Christ Child, standing upon the sacramental chalice, flanked by bowing angels. Two more angels, holding tall candelabra, stand in weight-shift pose to either side of the tabernacle. All of this, apparently, rested upon a base containing a relief of the Lamentation, which seems rather out of place in an otherwise festive context.

Yet this remembrance of Christ's Passion is essential to Desiderio's iconographic program. The body of Christ forms the base upon which his spiritual body (in the form of the sacrament) is contained and above which the Benediction is given. Wherever its first location was, the tabernacle was removed in 1677, taken apart and reassembled for use in the Neroni family chapel in the right transept.

For the Neroni, the sculptural components of the tabernacle were recomposed, with the flanking candelabra angels placed in reverse, in outwardly facing positions. Console blocks were used to support the tabernacle which, in a final Baroque touch, was set against a background of colored marble slabs. More recently, the tabernacle has been relocated to the right side of the nave of San Lorenzo and reconstructed in accordance with what is believed to have been the sculptor's original intent, although it is thought that a number of elements have disappeared.

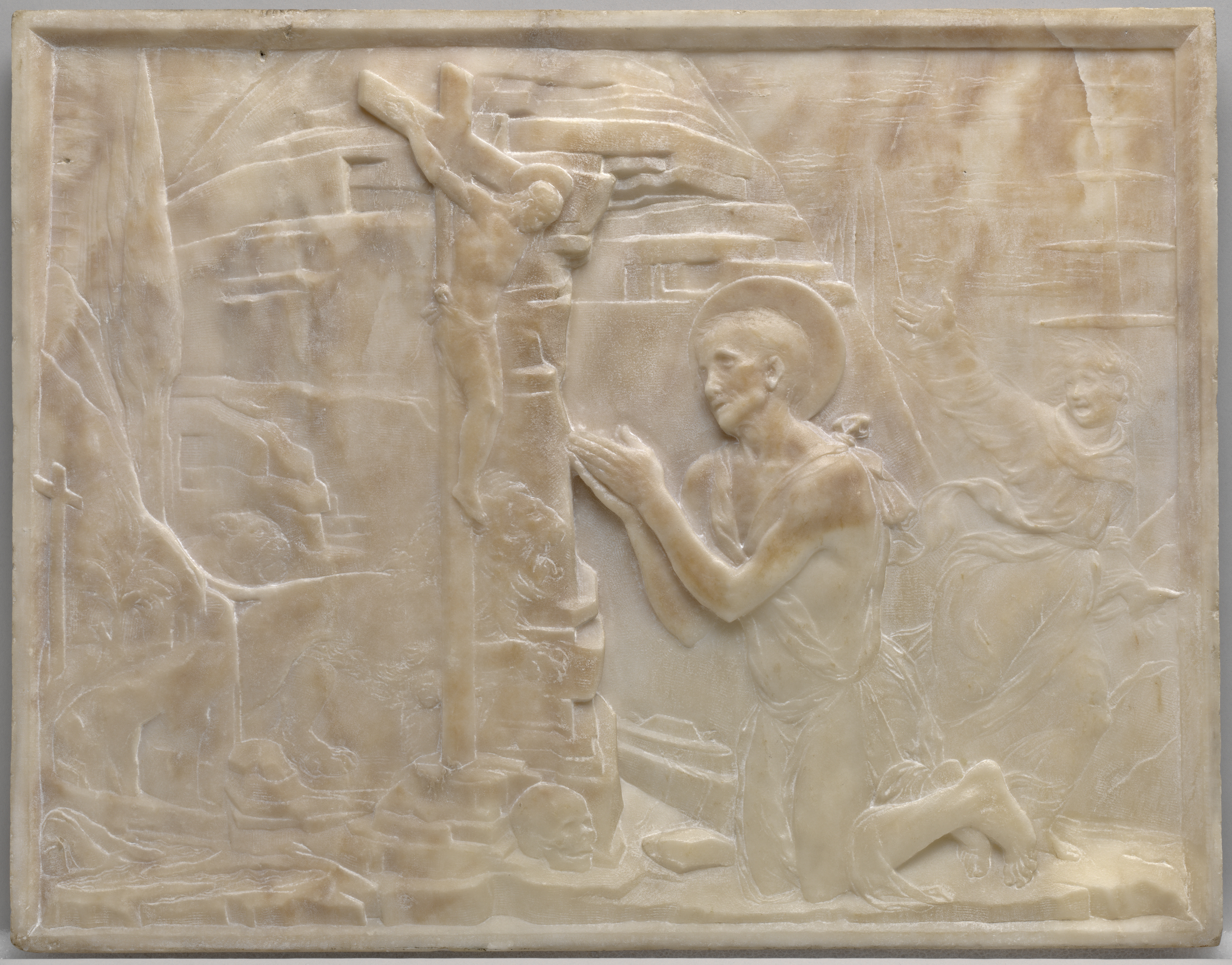
Saint Jerome in the Desert, c. 1461, National Gallery of Art

The Lamentation relief provides a fine example of Desiderio's talent for low relief carving, but really does not display his mastery of rilievo schiaccato, in the execution of which he was second only to Donatello.

=== Reliefs ===
For Desiderio's handling of relief in marble we must turn to his "flattened relief" panel of Saint Jerome at Prayer in the Desert (National Gallery of Art, Washington, D.C.) or his tondo of the Meeting of Christ and John the Baptist as Youths (Louvre, Paris). The Saint Jerome "comes as close to painting as sculpture can get and the expressive faces of Christ and John in the tondo demonstrate the 15th-century appreciation of Desiderio by Giovanni Santi, the father of Raphael, who spoke of "the dreamy Desiderio, so gentle and beautiful".

=== Other works ===
Beyond the Marsuppini tomb and the San Lorenzo tabernacle, little of Desiderio's work is documented or dated and a chronological reconstruction of his artistic development is a matter of conjecture based upon stylistic comparisons. The extent of his autograph work has been debated; many works sometimes attributed to him might be better given to assistants, followers, or to his brother Geri, with whom he frequently collaborated.

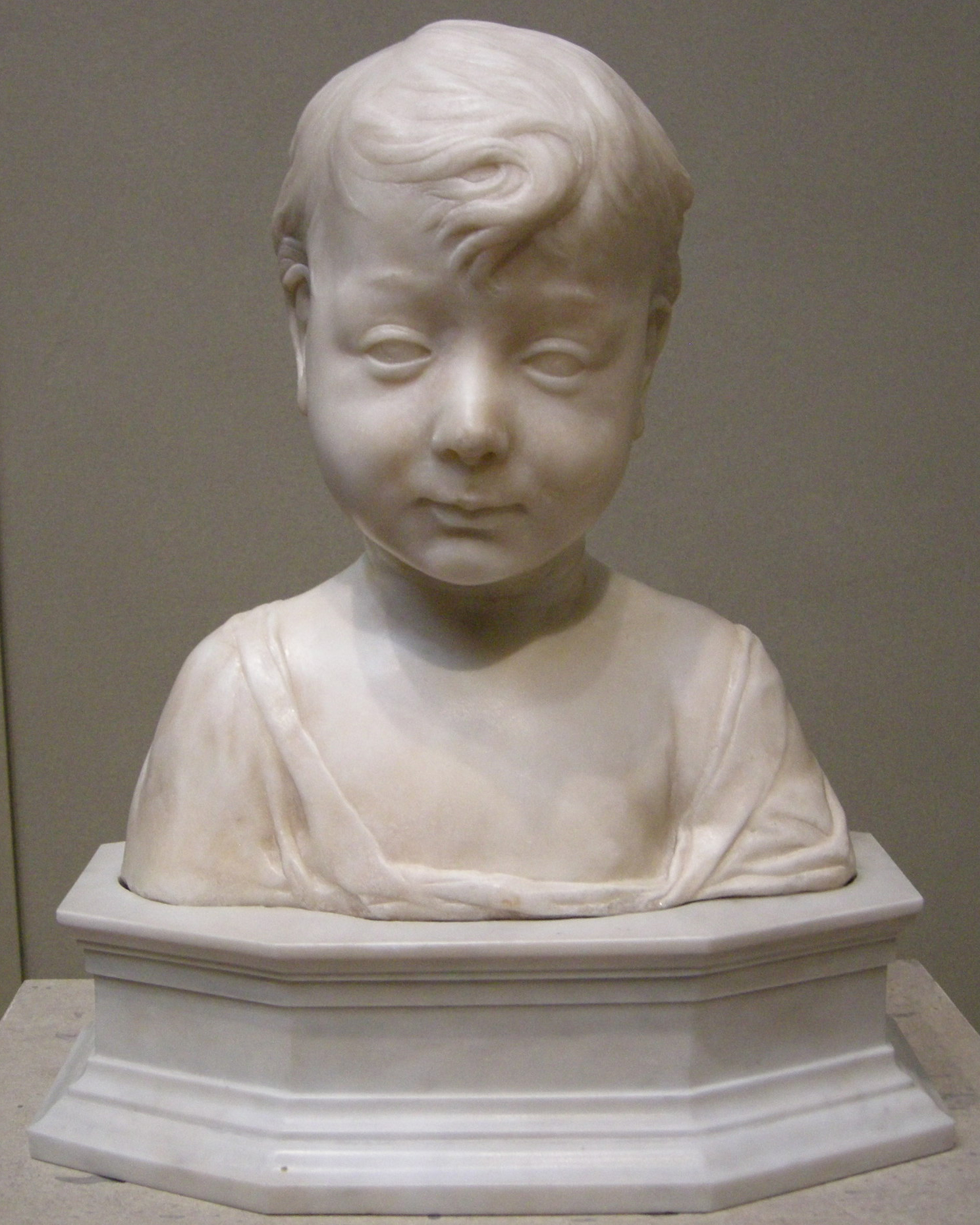
Child (The Christ Child ?), 1455–60, National Gallery of Art, Washington, D.C. (1937.1.113)

=== Portraits ===
Desiderio made great contributions in the field of portraiture especially as it came to the representation of children. This was a genre which he practically reinvented, drawing upon Roman examples of the Augustan Age. Such sculptures present their youthful subjects with informality even animation; often with open-mouthed expression, they convey a sense of immediacy. His name has been connected with several marble and wooden female busts. The best of these include the Marble Bust of Marietta Strozzi in Berlin that projects a soft, ethereal beauty that seems to originate from a marble surface that glows from within the stone.

Throughout his brief career, one of the most telling characteristics of his technique was his unusual ability to give to his sculptures a textural sensuousness that might seem to demand touch: of all Quattrocento sculptors, Desiderio was, perhaps, the most tactile in his appeal. His work displays true understanding for the crystalline luminosity of marble and how a gently polished and modulated surface could produce an inner glow and how Donatello's famed rilievo schiacciato could be further refined to convey a sense of light softly diffused by its passage through atmosphere. At his best Desiderio da Settignano was a sculptor of soft persuasion and subtle nuances.^{Ref missing.}

Giorgio Vasari includes a biography of Desiderio da Settignano in his Lives of the Artists (1550/1568). According to Vasari, his last work was the painted wooden statue of St. Mary Magdalene, now in Santa Trinita, left unfinished and completed by Benedetto da Maiano after Desiderio's death.

Desiderio da Settignano died in Florence in 1464. The most famous of his pupils was Simone Ferrucci.

== Selected works ==
=== In Florence, Italy ===
In situ

- Penitent Magdalene, (attributed, 1455), Basilica of the Holy Trinity, Florence
- Tomb of Carlo Marsuppini (1459) in Basilica di Santa Croce, Florence
- The Altar of the Sacrament in San Lorenzo (completed in 1461 or 1464), Basilica di San Lorenzo

Bargello Museum

- Madonna and Child in Swaddling Clothes, marble relief
- Portrait of a Boy Looking Down/San Giovannino (c. 1450–55), pietra serena
- Young John the Baptist, marble bust

=== Elsewhere in Europe ===
- Laughing Boy (c. 1464), marble bust, Kunsthistorisches Museum (9104), Vienna, Austria
- Meeting of Christ and John the Baptist as Youths, marble relief tondo, Louvre, Paris, France
- Julius Caesar in Profile (c. 1460), marble high relief, Louvre, Paris
- Marietta Strozzi (c. 1460), marble bust, Bode Museum (77), Berlin, Germany
- Olimpia, Queen of Macedonia (c. 1460), Galería de las Colecciones Reales, Madrid, Spain

=== In the US ===
- Bust of a Young Boy (c. 1460), marble bust, J. Paul Getty Museum, Los Angeles, CA
- Beauregard Madonna with Standing Christ Child (c. 1455), marble relief, Norton Simon Museum, Pasadena, CA
- The Virgin and Child (c. 1455–1460), marble relief, Philadelphia Museum of Art

National Gallery of Art, Washington, D.C.

- A Little Boy (c. 1455–1460), marble bust
- The Christ Child (?) (c. 1460), marble bust
- Saint Jerome in the Desert (c. 1461), marble relief
- Ciborium of the Sacrament (c. 1460s), marble, with 19th century compliments
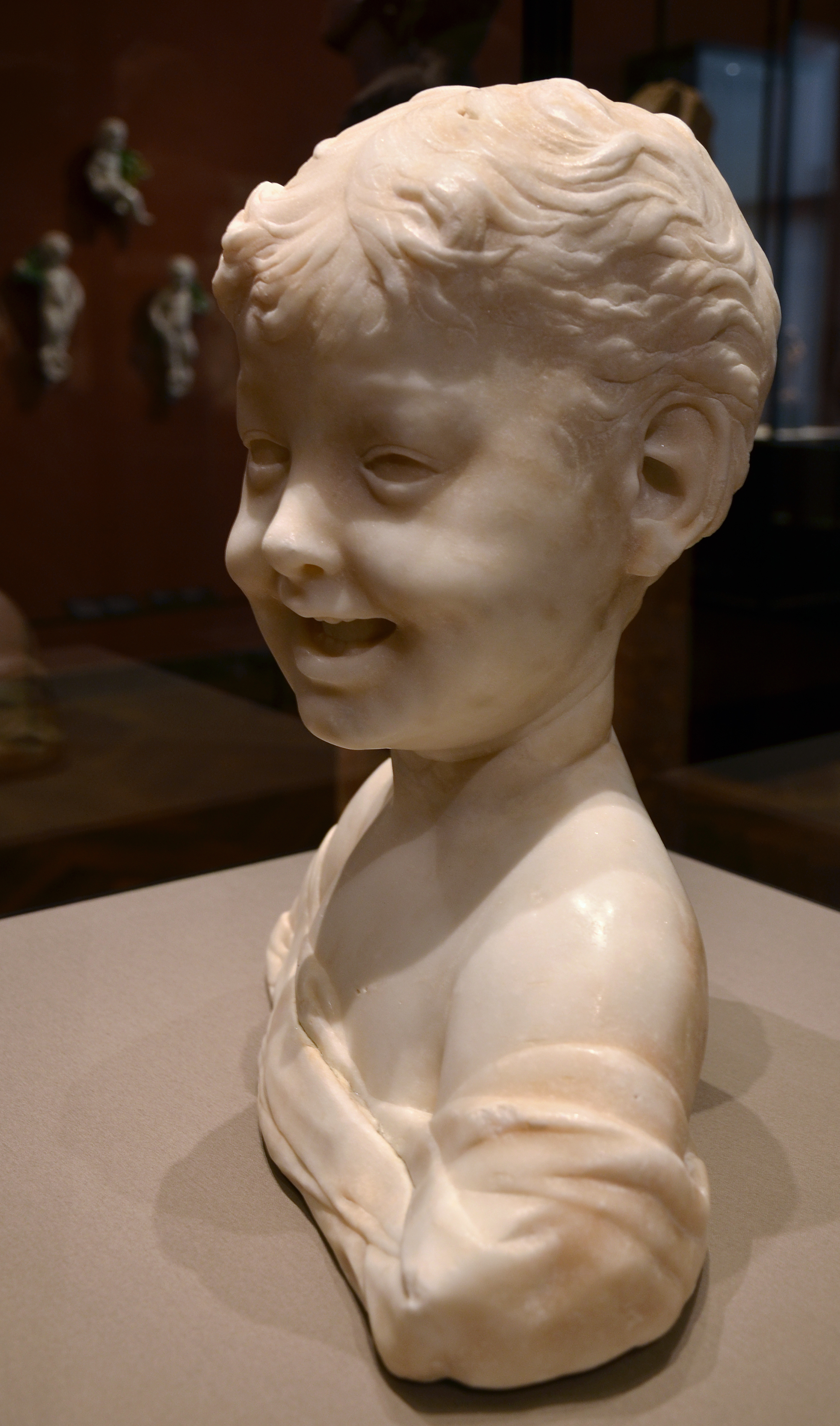
Laughing Boy, 1460–65, Kunsthistorisches Museum, Vienna

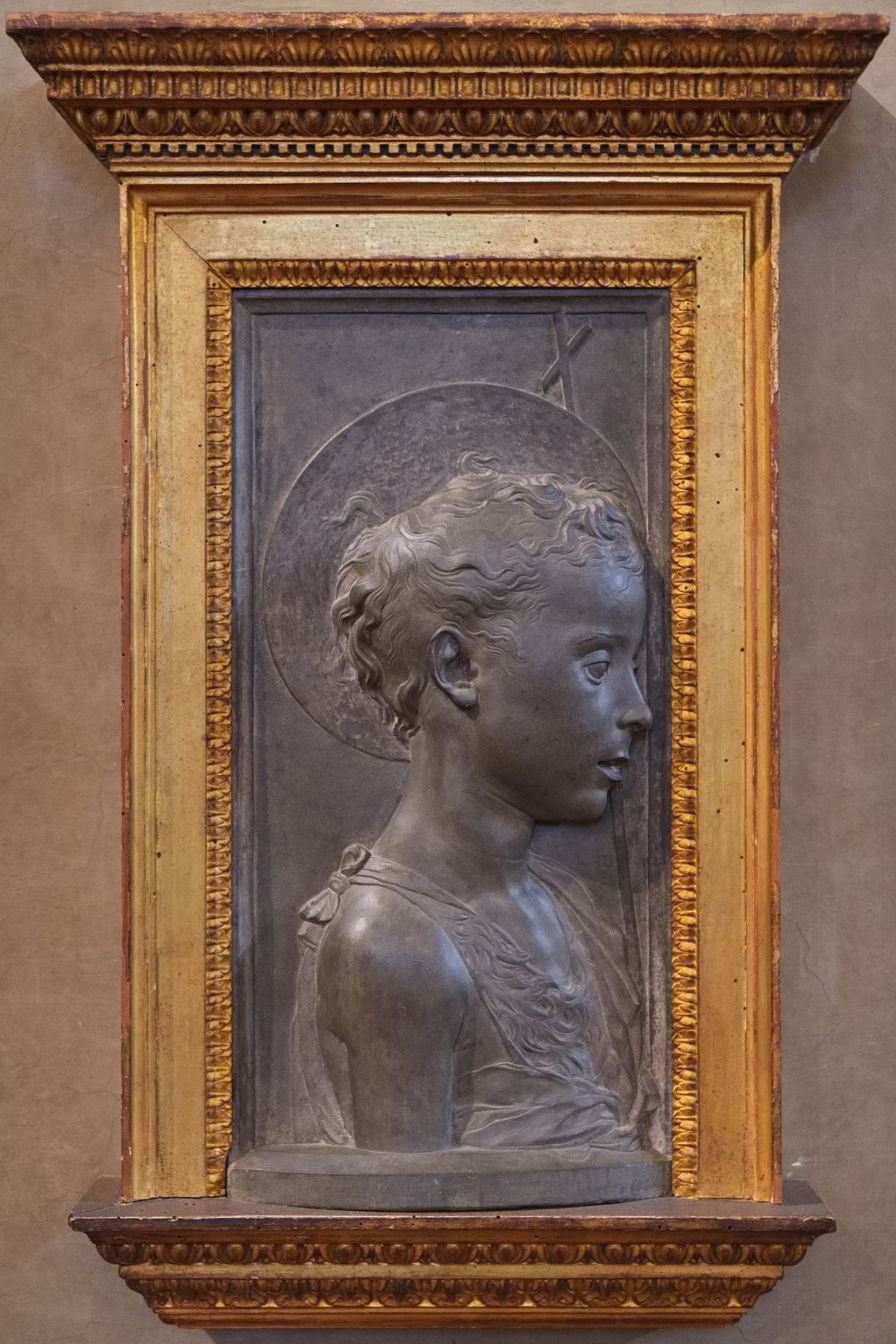
San Giovannino, c. 1450–55, Macigno stone, Bargello, Florence

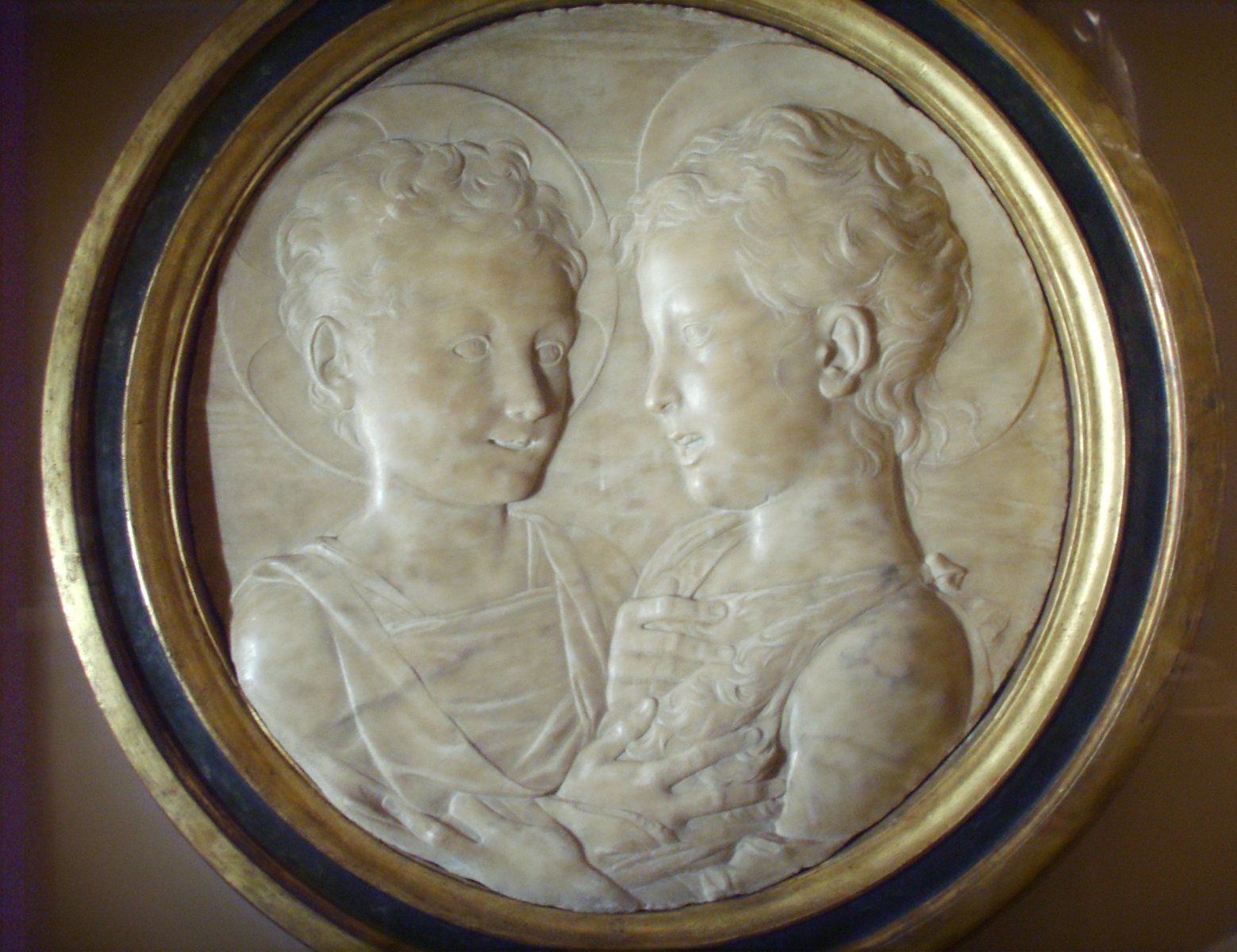
Meeting of Christ and John the Baptist as Youths, 1455–57, Louvre, Paris

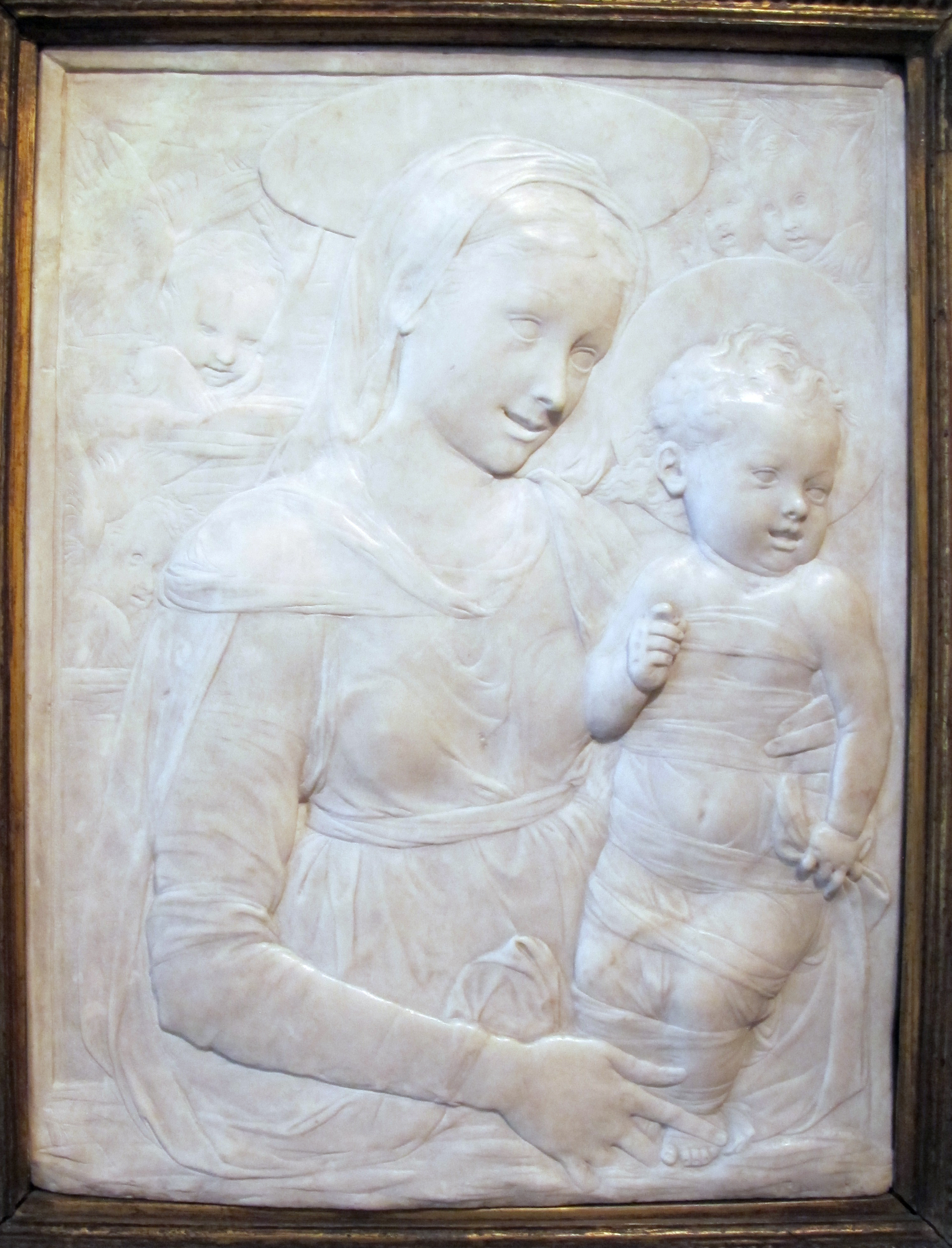
The Virgin and Child, c. 1455–60, Philadelphia Museum of Art

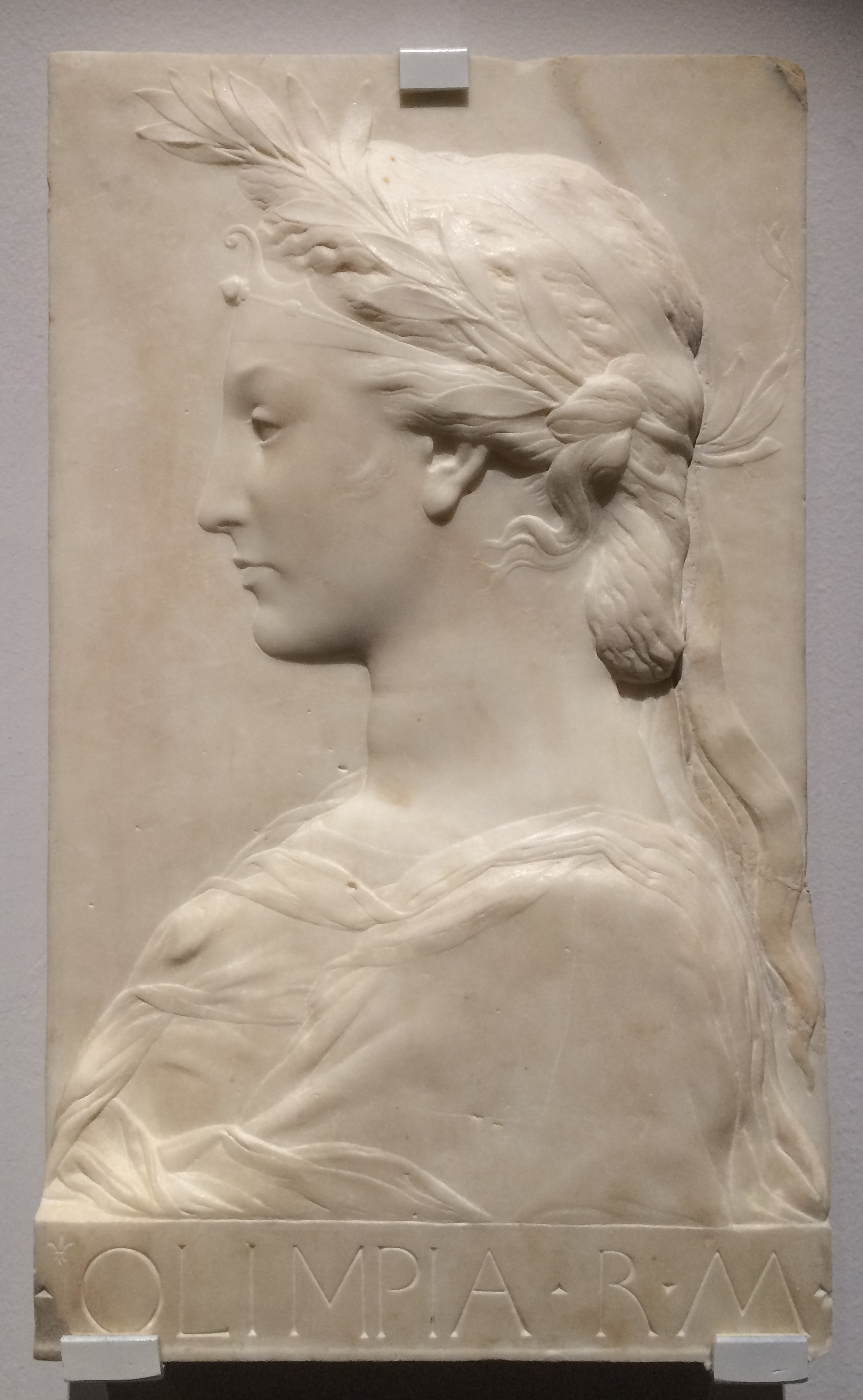
Olimpia, Queen of Macedonia, c. 1460, Galería de las Colecciones Reales, Madrid

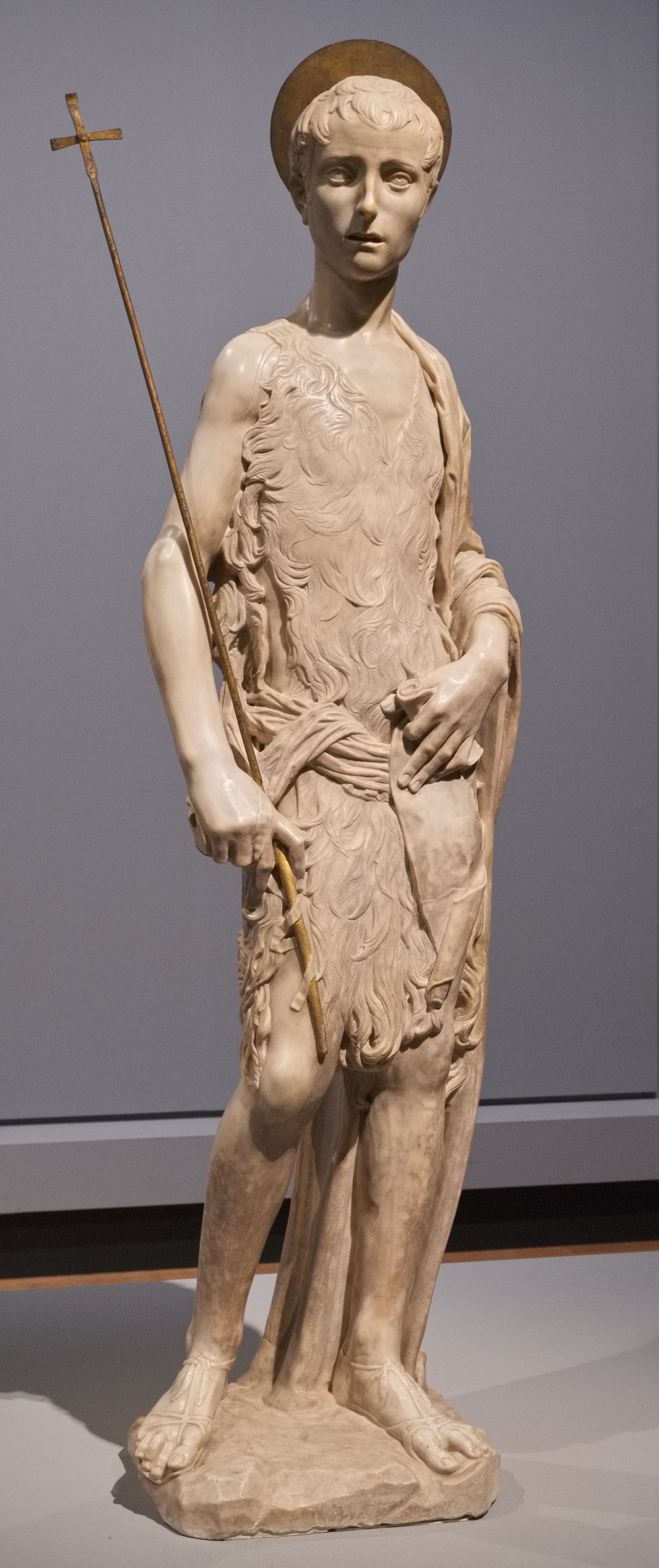
St. John the Baptist of Casa Martelli (attributed), Bargello, Florence

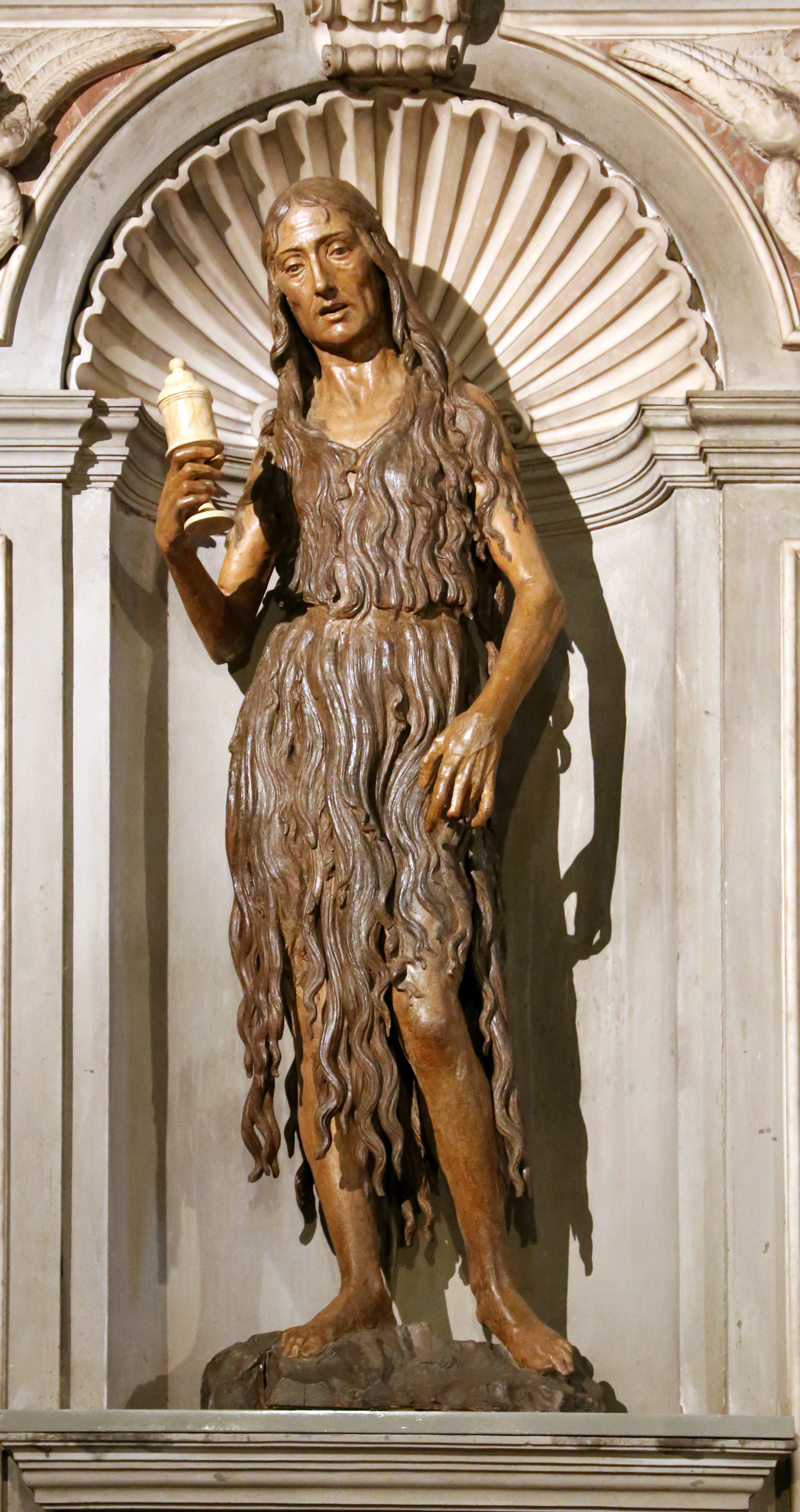
Penitent Magdalene, 1455 (attr.), Basilica of the Holy Trinity, Florence

== See also ==
- Master of the Marble Madonnas
