= Master of the Marble Madonnas =

Italian sculptor

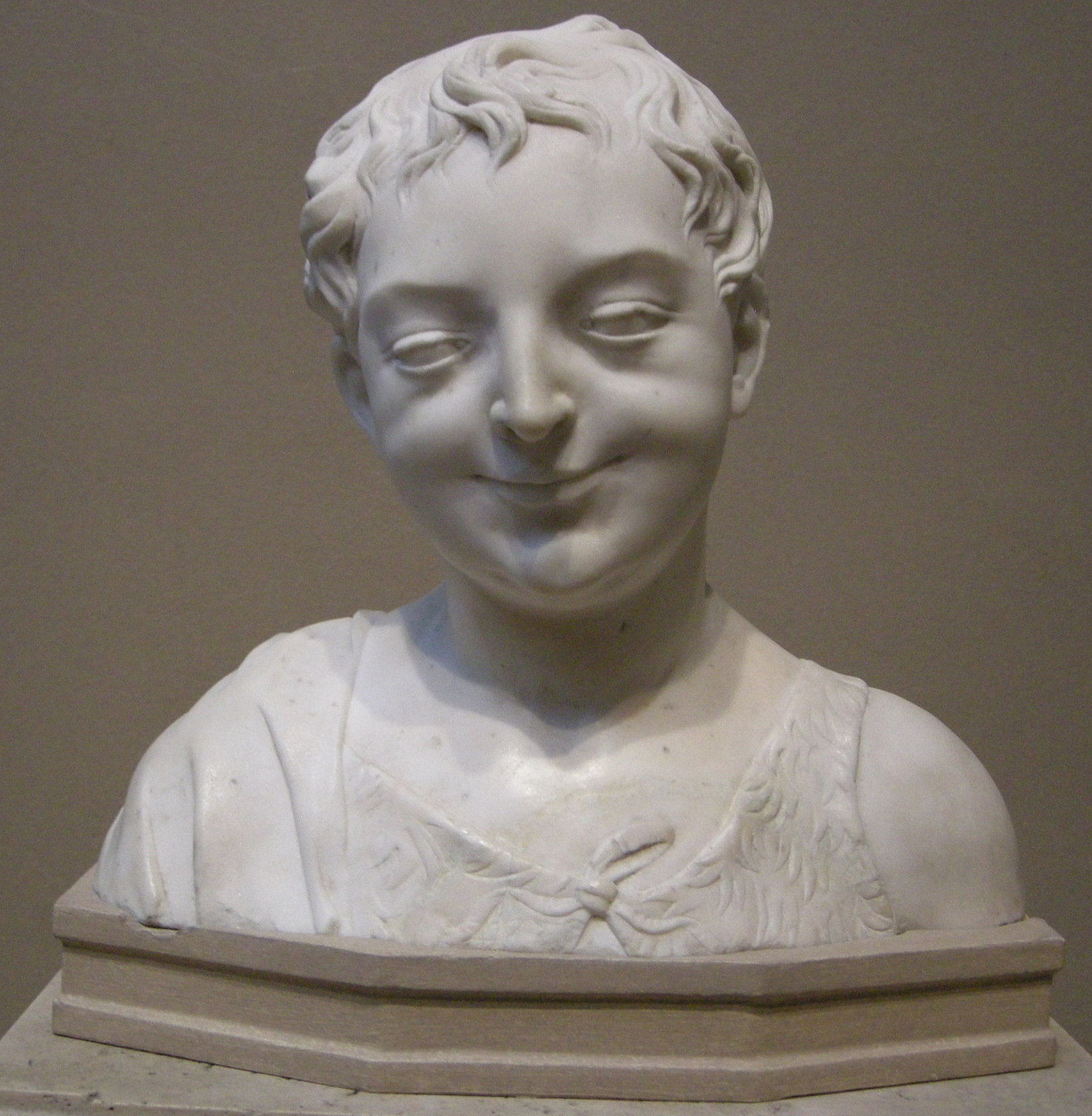
The Young Saint John the Baptist, marble of c. 1470/1500, in the National Gallery of Art

The Master of the Marble Madonnas was the name given to an unidentified sculptor, or perhaps group of sculptors, active in the Tuscan region of Italy between c. 1470 and c.1500. He is thought to have been responsible for a group of stylistically related sculptures that is based mainly on their related compositions and drapery forms. Products of the Master's workshop include a large number of reliefs of the Virgin and Child; busts and reliefs depicting the suffering of Christ were also popular, as were busts of children. Various mannerisms can be seen in this group, as well; among these has been what is described as "a peculiar feline smile from heavy-lidded eyes and a taut jaw, at its best radiating inward joy but often acerbic or bordering on the manic."

In 2001, Alfredo Bellandi presented evidence connecting the Master of the Marble Madonnas and the sculptures associated with that name to a rather obscure Florentine sculptor named Gregorio di Lorenzo. Gregorio was trained in the workshop of Desiderio da Settignano, absorbing through him characteristics common to the Rossellino brothers. As an independent master, Gregorio di Lorenzo is documented in Florence from 1455 to 1495. The identification of the Master with Gregorio di Lorenzo is now generally accepted.

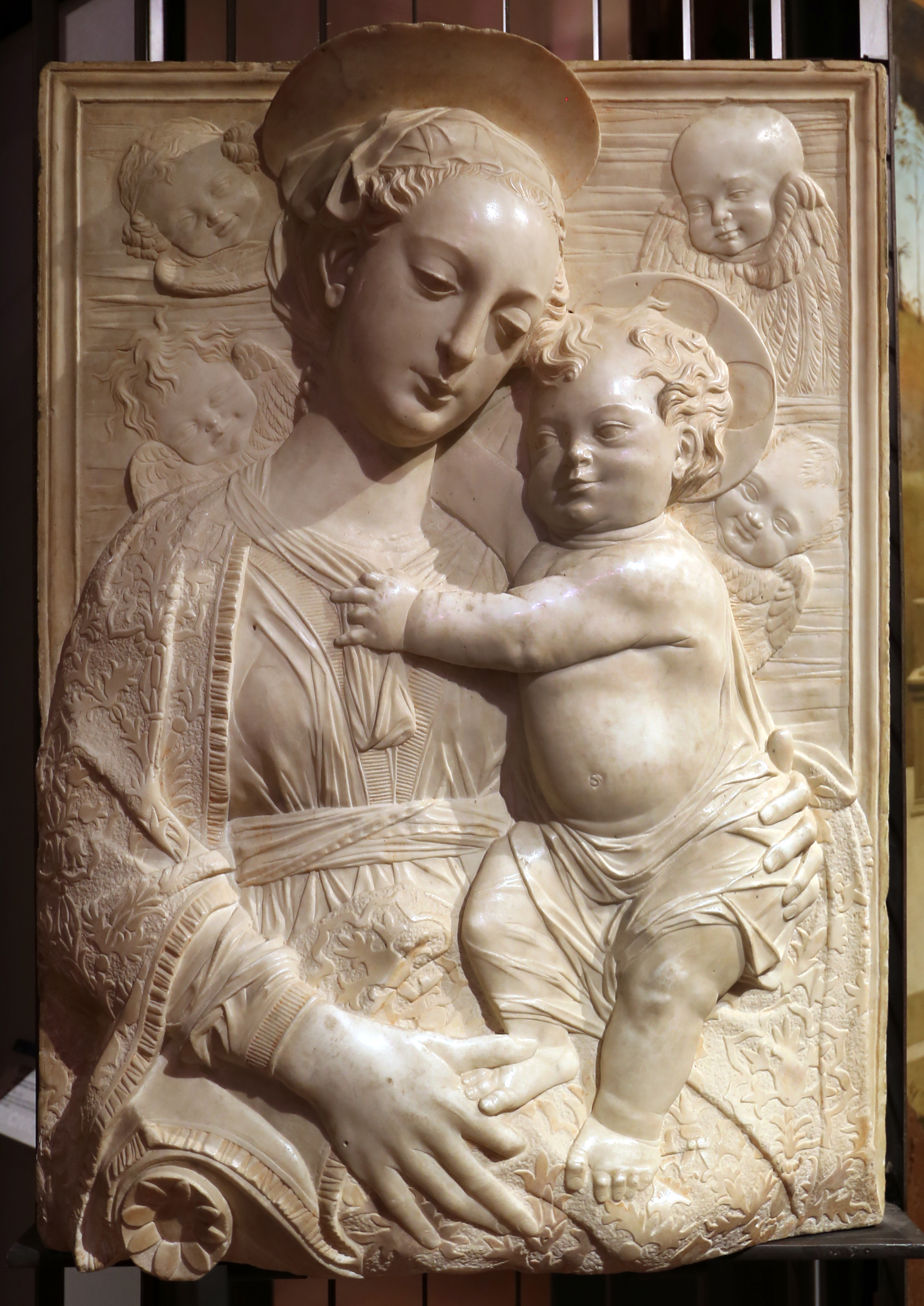
Madonna and Child, attributed to Gregorio di Lorenzo

The name "Master of the Marble Madonnas" was coined by Wilhelm von Bode in 1886, who noted several points of similarity linking these sculptures to the production of well-known Florentine masters such as Mino da Fiesole, Antonio Rossellino, Desiderio da Settignano, and Benedetto da Maiano but which are generally inferior in quality and execution. Under whom this "Master of the Marble Madonnas" might have received his training is unknown but it surely would have been in the workshop of one of these masters. Previous attempts to identify van Bode's Master of the Marble Madonnas with either Giovanni Ricci, Domenico Rosselli, or Tommaso Fiamberti did not gain wide acceptance. Fiamberti's name did receive the most critical support.

Gregorio di Lorenzo is known also to have worked in the ducal courts of Urbino and Ferrara, also making trips to Hungary to serve Matthias Corvinus and to Italian outposts along the eastern Adriatic. His significance to the Italian Renaissance lies not so much in any particular work but in the overall contribution he rendered in spreading the Florentine approach to sculpture to a wider audience.

Works by the Master can be found in various museum collections, including those of the Pinacoteca Civica, in Forlì (Italy); Columbia Museum of Art in Columbia, SC; National Gallery of Canada in Ottawa; National Gallery of Art in Washington, D.C.; the National Gallery of Australia; and the Louvre. The Washington collection also contains a nineteenth-century work copying his style.
