= Domenico Rosselli =

Italian sculptor

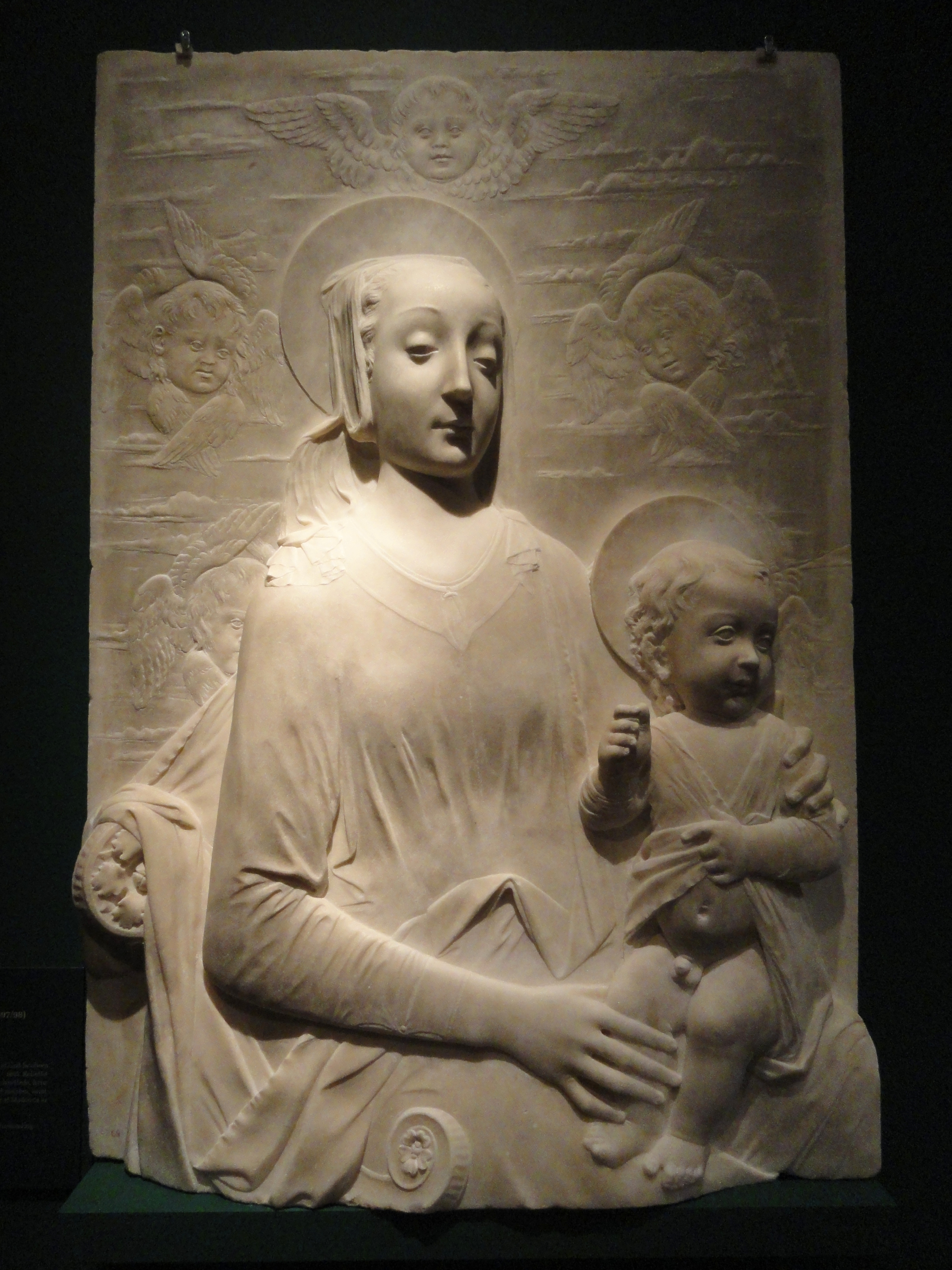
Madonna by Domenico Rosselli, in the Ny Carlsberg Glyptotek

Domenico Rosselli (c. 1439 – 1498) was an Italian sculptor.

Details of Rosselli's life are limited, but he seems to have trained in Florence. He is best known for his work on many of the friezes, sculpted doorways and decorative fireplaces in the Ducal Palace in Urbino, most particularly the angel fireplace, which depicts the Camino angels, in the Sala degli Angeli. Some authors have also identified him as the Master of the Marble Madonnas, although the assertion is by no means certain. After working in Bologna, Italy in the year 1460 and then in Pisa, two years later, Domenico moved to Florence, but he left the city for the Marche region twelve years later.
