= Ferruccio Mataresi =

- Born: 18 May 1928; Livorno
- Died: Livorno; 9 January 2009
- Known for: Painting

Ferruccio Mataresi (1928 – 2009) was born in Livorno and began his artistic career in 1940 with the teaching of the painter Eugenio Carraresi it continues the study in the Accademia delle Belle Arti of Florence and it frequents the study of Pietro Annigoni.

To Livorno he is the only painter to follow the teachings and the Neoclassic pictorial tide of Pietro Annigoni that it transfers readapting in the century XIX the painting proper of the Renaissance period.

Numerous portraits created by Mataresi of well-known people from the city of Livorno to famous historical figures include: Carlo Azeglio Ciampi, Giovanni Paolo II, Padre Lanfranco Serrini and the baritone Danilo Checchi. Of particular aesthetic value and beautiful examples of this artist's pictorial style, are the portrait of the writer and painter Riccardo Rossi Menicagli from 1984 and his sister Isabella Rossi (nephews of the painter Voltolino Fontani and friends of Mataresi).

Some works are located in public collections and deprived by to quote the positions at the Building of the Quirinale, to the center Rai, and to the Domus Pacis, to the Franciscan Museum modern art to Assisi and to the Museum Civic Giovanni Fattori of Livorno. Bashful artist to lived a solitary life among his few students, to remember the painter Nicola Giusfredi, spending his years in the study of art Scali d'Azeglio to take care of his painting and his pet. On March 2, 2024, a conference was held in the Giovanni Fattori Civic Museum of Livorno entitled: Ferruccio Mataresi, protagonist of the 20th century in Livorno, speaker Fabio Sottili.

== Prizes and public works ==
- 1987, Ferdinando Donzelli, "Livornesi Painters, Second Twentieth Century", Cappelli Editore Bologna.
- 1993, Portrait of John Paul II, exhibited in the refectory of the Basilica of St. Francis in Assisi.
- 2005 Solo exhibition entitled "Sacred Art and Portraits", at the Abbey of San Zeno.
- 2007, International art prize "Le muse" in the 42nd edition, Livorno.
- 2023, Emanuele Barletti and Fabio Sottili, Ferruccio Mataresi in the exhibition "Pietro Annigoni, painter of magnificent intellect". Livorno, "Giovanni Fattori" Civic Museum.
