= Simone di Nanni Ferrucci =

Italian sculptor

Simone di Nanni Ferrucci (born c. 1402) was an Italian sculptor. His date of death is unknown.

Ferrucci was born in Fiesole into a family of artists, including his son Simone Ferrucci and his nephew Andrea Ferrucci. Ferrucci primarily produced religious-themed sculptures for commissions.
