= Arte dei Maestri di Pietra e Legname =

Stonemasons and Woodcarvers Guild of Florence

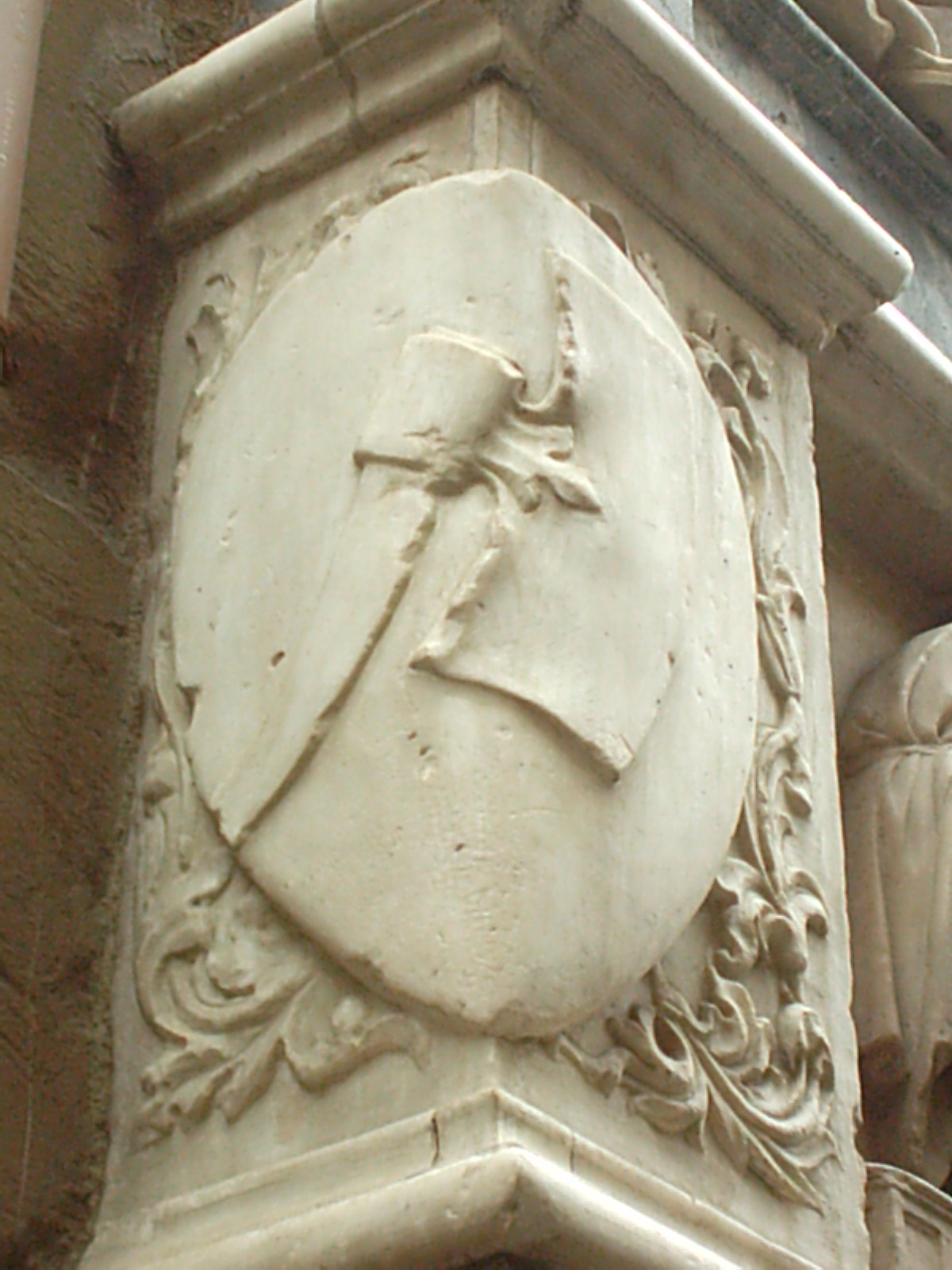

The Arte dei Maestri di Pietra e Legname was one of the Guilds of Florence that represented the Master stonemasons, woodcarvers, and sculptors. It was founded before 1236, and it came to absorb multiple building crafts in the Florence area. It was one of the five Arti Mediani ("middle trades")

It was listed as Muratori e Scarpellini (builders and stonemasons) in a 1236 list of the guilds, and listed fifth in precedence among the minor guilds although it was raised to fourth in 1280, when the tanners and curriers were relegated.

== Members ==
=== Notable member ===
- Andrea Orcagna

=== Other members ===
- Nanni di Banco
- Simone Ferrucci
