= Luigi Ferrucci =

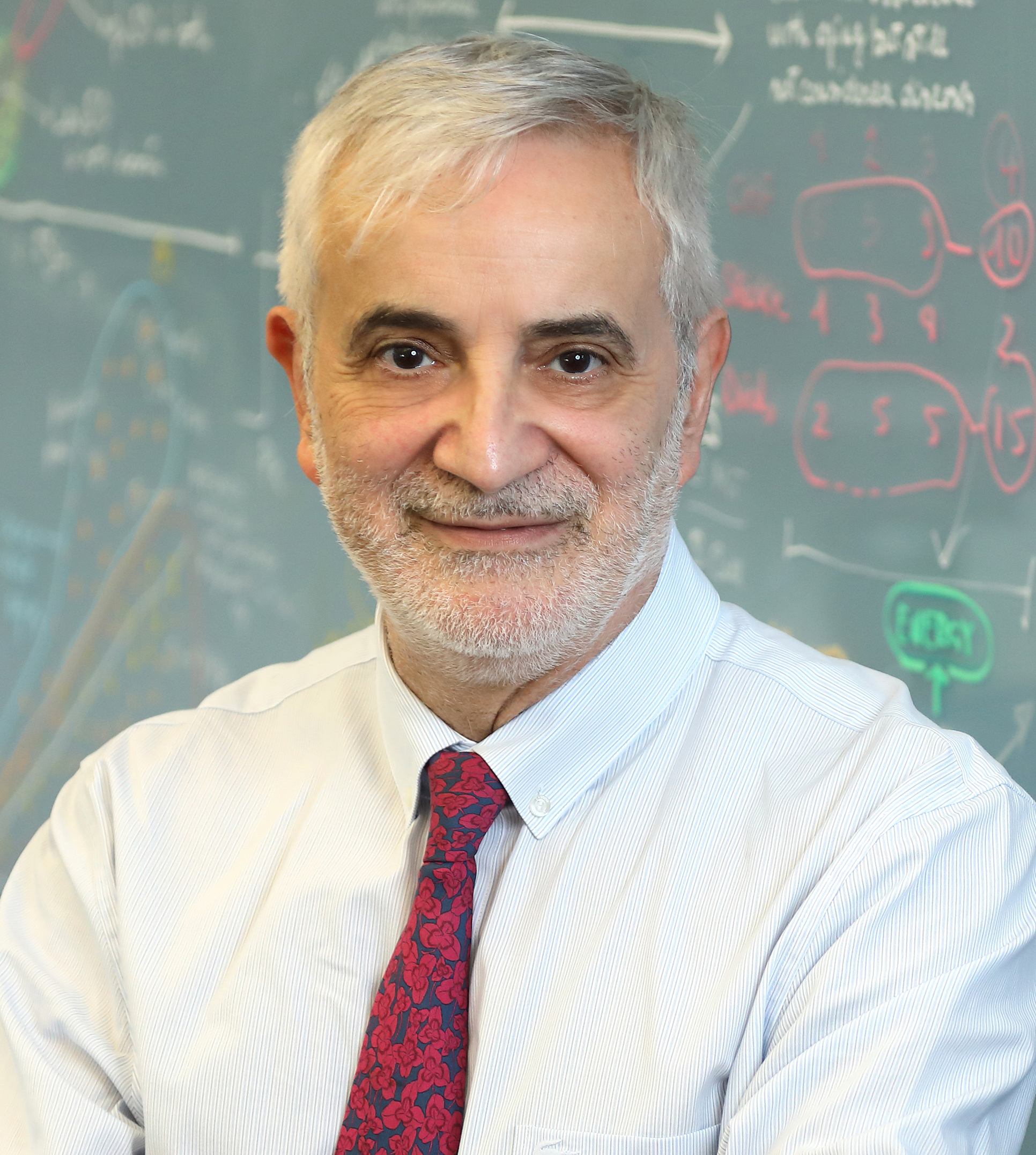
- Ferrucci in 2021
- Education: University of Florence
- Scientific career
- Fields: Aging, epidemiology
- Workplaces: Istituto Superiore di Sanità; National Institutes of Health

Luigi Ferrucci is an Italian geriatrician and epidemiologist who conducts research on the causal pathways leading to progressive physical and cognitive decline in older persons. He has served as the scientific director of the National Institute on Aging since 2011.

== Education ==
Ferrucci received a M.D. and board certification in 1980, a board certification in geriatrics in 1982 and Ph.D. in biology and pathophysiology of aging in 1998 at the University of Florence.

== Career ==
Between 1985 and 2002, Ferrucci was chief of geriatric rehabilitation at the department of geriatric medicine and director of the laboratory of clinical epidemiology at the Istituto Superiore di Sanità. During the same period, he collaborated with the National Institute on Aging's (NIA) laboratory of epidemiology, demography, and biometry where he spent several periods as visiting scientist at National Institutes of Health (NIH).

In September 2002, Ferrucci became the chief of the longitudinal studies section at NIA and the director of the Baltimore Longitudinal Study on Aging. That year, he refined the design of the Baltimore study to focus on the geroscience hypothesis, which states the pace of biological aging is the root cause of many age-related chronic diseases, as well as physical and cognitive disability.

In May 2011, Ferrucci became the NIA scientific director. He reorganized NIA to foster interactions between disciplines, such as neuroimaging and neurophysiology. He has worked on projects with biochemists and led longitudinal studies in humans, such as the Genetic and Epigenetic Signatures of Translational Aging Laboratory Testing (GESTALT) study. Ferrucci conducts research on the causal pathways leading to progressive physical and cognitive decline in older persons. In April 2025, during the federal mass layoffs, he was among the NIH scientists who were initially laid off due to a "coding error" but was subsequently called back to work.
