= Ghedini =

Ghedini is a surname. Notable people with the surname include:

- Giorgio Federico Ghedini (1892–1965), Italian composer
- Giuseppe Ghedini (1707–1791), Italian painter
- Niccolò Ghedini (1959–2022), Italian lawyer and politician

== See also ==
- Ghidini
