= Ferruccio Azzarini =

Italian footballer (1924–2005)

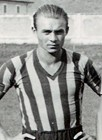

Personal information
- Date of birth: 8 November 1924
- Place of birth: Varese, Italy
- Date of death: 1 June 2005 (aged 80)
- Place of death: Verbania, Italy
- Position: Midfielder

Senior career*
Years	Team	Apps	(Gls)
1944–1945	Varese	3	(?)
1945–1946	Verbania		
1946–1947	Internazionale	10	(1)
1947–1948	Vigevano	36	(5)
1948–1949	Mantova	26	(8)
1949–1950	Pro Lissone		
1950–1954	Marzoli		
1954–1957	Verbania		
- * Club domestic league appearances and goals

Ferruccio Azzarini (8 November 1924 – 1 June 2005) was an Italian footballer.
