= Pienza Cathedral =

Cathedral in Italy

Coordinates: 43.0763°N 11.6791°E

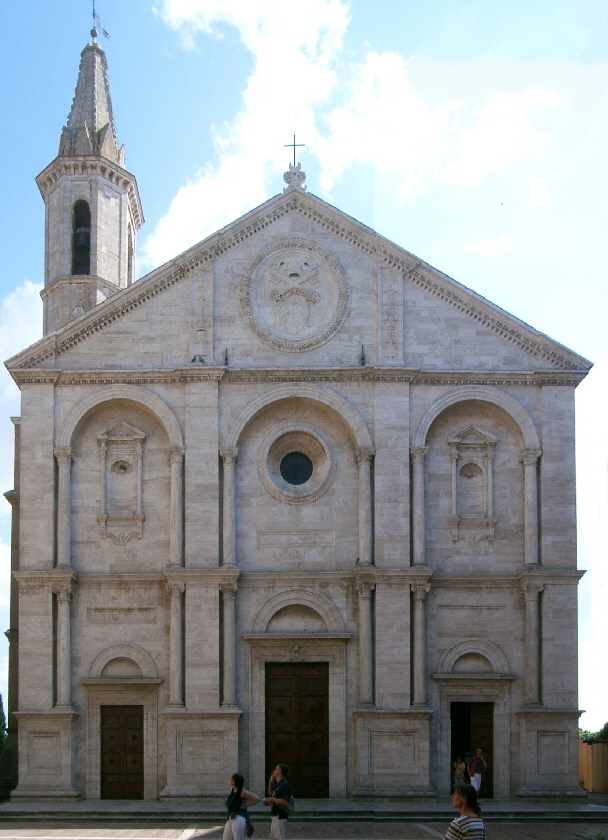
Pienza Cathedral

Pienza Cathedral (Italian: Duomo di Pienza; Concattedrale di Santa Maria Assunta) is a Roman Catholic cathedral dedicated to the Assumption of the Virgin Mary in Pienza, in the province of Siena, Italy.

From 1462 the episcopal seat of the Diocese of Pienza, then since 1773 of the Diocese of Chiusi-Pienza, it has been since 1986 a co-cathedral in the Diocese of Montepulciano-Chiusi-Pienza.

== Sources ==
- Johann Josef Böker: "Ita Pius iusserat, qui exemplar apud Germanos in Austria vidisset: Die spätgotischen Vorbilder des Domes von Pienza in Österreich". In: Wiener Jahrbuch für Kunstgeschichte 49, 1996, pp. 57–74 and 301–306
- Werner Goez: Von Pavia nach Rom, 4th edition, DuMont Buchverlag, Köln 1980, ISBN 3770105427
- Jan Pieper: Pienza – Der Entwurf einer humanistischen Weltsicht. Edition Axel Menges, Stuttgart 1997, ISBN 3930698064
- Heinz Schomann: Kunstdenkmäler in der Toskana. Wissenschaftliche Buchgesellschaft, Darmstadt 1990, ISBN 9783534068944
- Max Semrau: "Die Kunst der Renaissance in Italien und im Norden", 3rd edition, vol. III in Wilhelm Lübke, Grundriss der Kunstgeschichte, 14th edition, Paul Neff Verlag, Esslingen 1912
- Conrad Streit: Florenz – Toskana – Umbrien, Land der Etrusker. Walter-Verlag, Olten und Freiburg im Breisgau, 1972 (Sonderausgabe für die Wissenschaftliche Buchgesellschaft Darmstadt), ISBN 9783530858068
- Andreas Tönnesmann: Pienza – Städtebau und Humanismus. 2nd edition 1996, Hirmer Verlag München, ISBN 3777454109
- Klaus Zimmermanns: Toscana – Das Hügelland und die historischen Stadtzentren. 9th edition, Du Mont Buchverlag, Köln 1986, ISBN 3770110501
