= Simone Ferrucci =

Italian sculptor

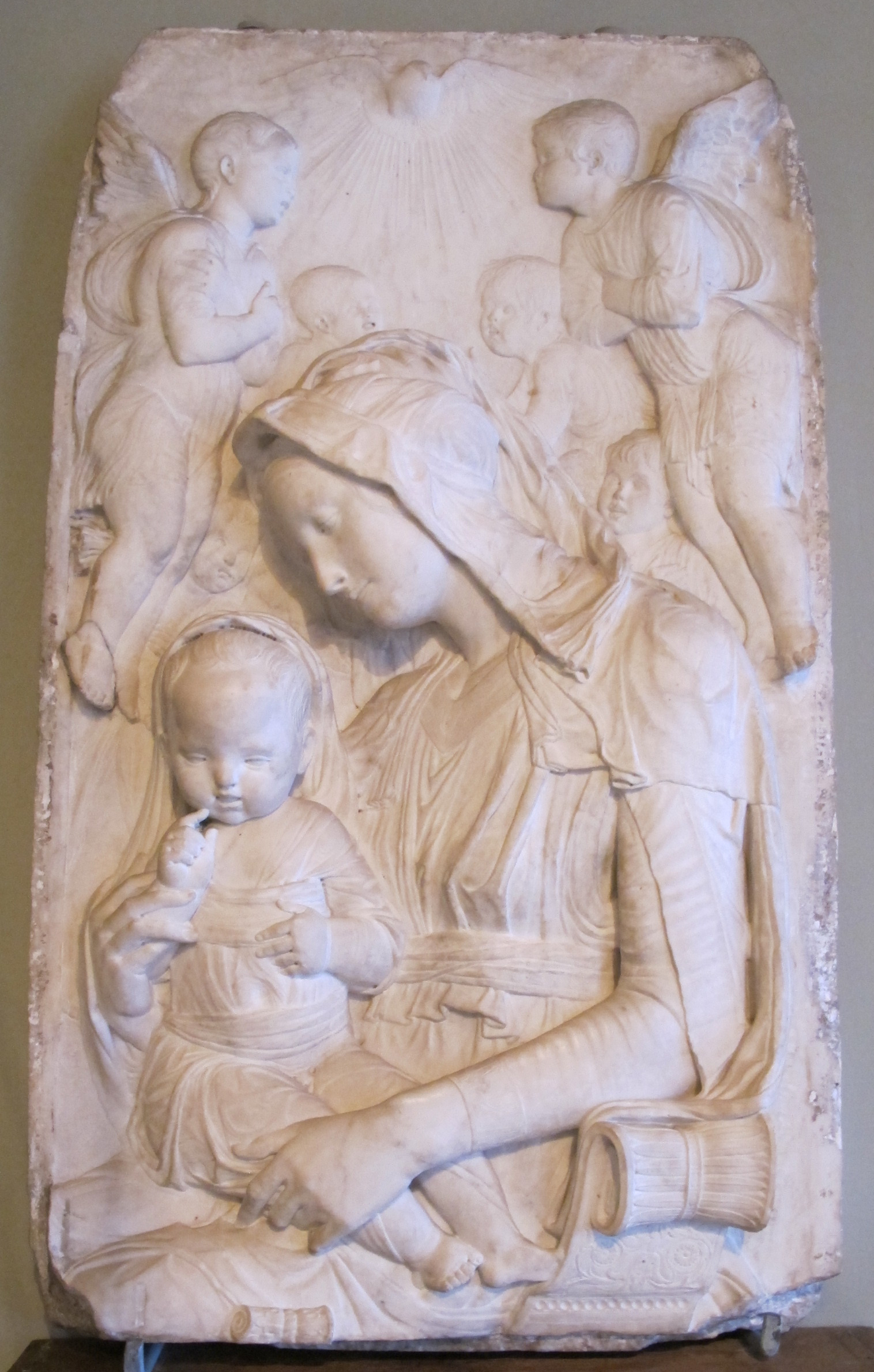
Virgin and Child with Angels by Simone Ferrucci, Hermitage Museum

Simone Ferrucci (1437–1493), also Francesco di Simone Ferrucci, was an Italian sculptor.

Ferrucci was born in Fiesole into a family of artists, and was probably trained by his father, Simone di Nanni Ferrucci. He was also first cousin to Andrea Ferrucci. He was also influenced by Desiderio da Settignano and Andrea del Verrocchio. In 1463 he joined the Arte dei Maestri di Pietra e di Legname, the Florentine sculptors' wood and stone workers guild, and established a workshop in Florence in 1466. The art historian Vasari named him among the pupils of Andrea del Verrocchio who he most likely worked with in the 1470s. Ferrucci primarily produced religious-themed sculptures for commissions.

Records indicate that by 1470 Ferrucci was married and owned a house in Florence. He lived and worked in Florence until his death in 1493.
