= Ferruccio Ghidini =

Italian footballer

Personal information
- Date of birth: February 29, 1912
- Place of birth: Milan, Italy
- Height: 1.75 m (5 ft 9 in)
- Position: Midfielder

Senior career*
Years	Team	Apps	(Gls)
1931–1932	Ambrosiana-Inter	0	(0)
1932–1933	Bologna	2	(0)
1933–1937	Ambrosiana-Inter	55	(1)
1937–1943	Alessandria	131	(2)
- * Club domestic league appearances and goals

Ferruccio Ghidini (born February 29, 1912, in Milan) was an Italian professional football player.
