= James Hankins =

American historian

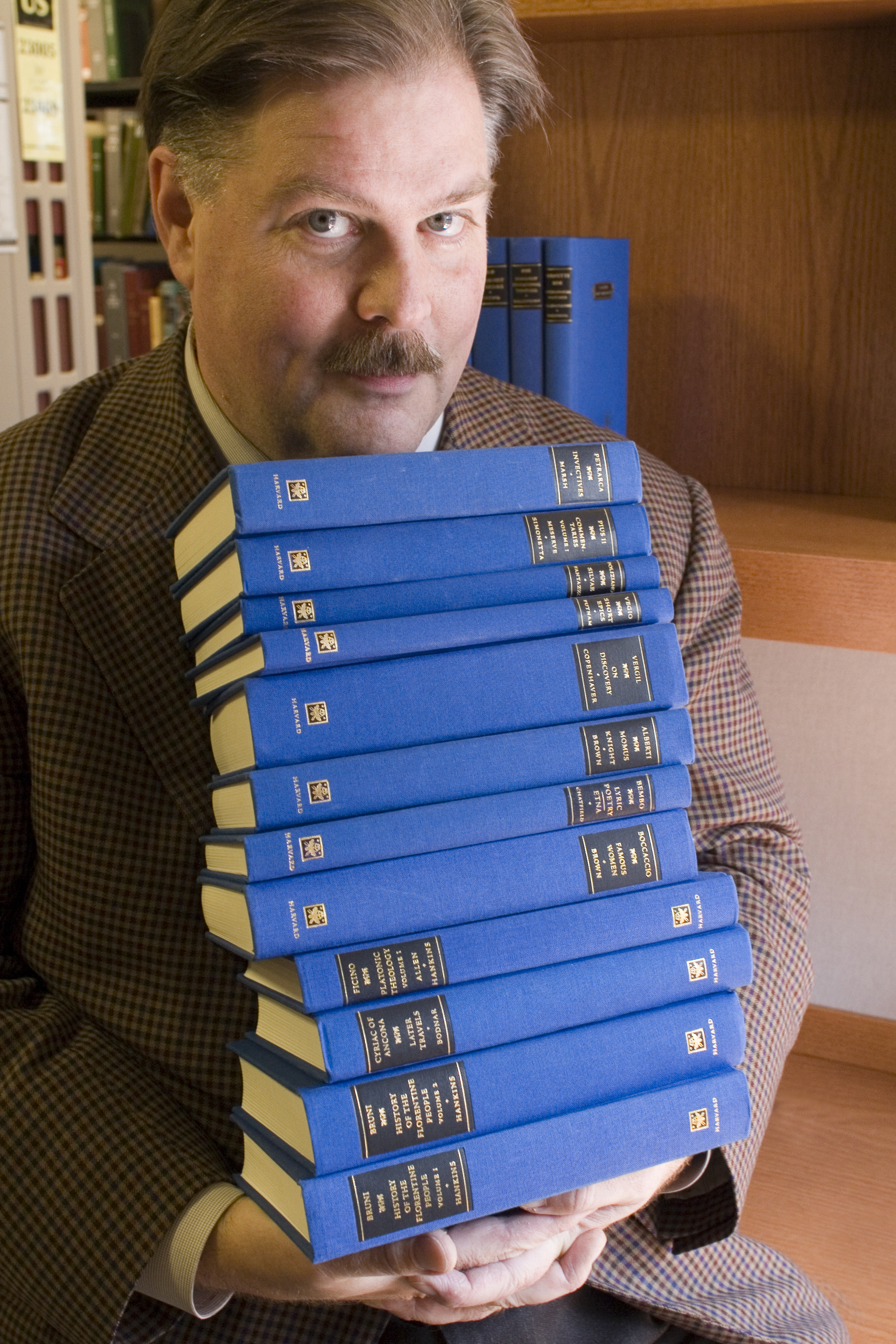
- Hankins in 2006
- Born: 1955 (age 70–71); Philadelphia, Pennsylvania, U.S.
- Education: Duke University (BA); Columbia University (MA, MPhil, PhD)
- Occupations: Renaissance intellectual historian; history professor

James Hankins (born 1955) is an American intellectual historian specializing in the Italian Renaissance. He is the general editor of the I Tatti Renaissance Library and the associate editor of the Catalogus Translationum et Commentariorum. He was a professor of history at Harvard University. In spring 2018, he was a visiting research fellow at the University of Notre Dame Center for Ethics and Culture.

In 2012, he was honored with the Paul Oskar Kristeller Lifetime Achievement Award of the Renaissance Society of America. In December 2025, he announced that he was leaving Harvard University in favor of the Hamilton School of Classical and Civic Education of the University of Florida because he believed Harvard University was no longer committed to teaching the history of Western civilization.

== Education and early career ==
Hankins was born in Philadelphia, Pennsylvania. He graduated from Duke University with a Bachelor of Arts in classics in 1977. He then earned a Master of Arts in 1978, a Master of Philosophy in 1980, and a Ph.D. in history in 1984 from Columbia University. At Columbia, he worked with Eugene F. Rice and the historian of philosophy Paul Oskar Kristeller, serving as the latter's research assistant for six years. In 1985 he joined the history faculty at Harvard University.

== Work and recognition ==
Hankins' monographic work centers on the history of philosophy, theology, literature and political thought. Since 1998 he has been general editor of the I Tatti Renaissance Library, which he founded together with Walter Kaiser, director of the Villa I Tatti, the Harvard University Center for Italian Renaissance Studies. Under Hankins' editorship the series has published over fifty volumes between 2001 and 2012 and sold close to 80,000 volumes. Since 2003 he has also been associate editor of the Catalogus Translationum et Commentariorum: Medieval and Renaissance Translations and Commentaries, Annotated Lists and Guides, a publication founded by his mentor Paul Oskar Kristeller in 1945. He is the author or editor of over twenty volumes and more than eighty articles, essays and book chapters. Many of his shorter writings are accessible online, via "Digital Access to Scholarship at Harvard" (DASH).

Hankins has been a Fulbright Scholar, a member of the Society of Fellows in the Humanities at Columbia University, a fellow and visiting professor at the Villa I Tatti, a Guggenheim fellow, a fellow of the American Academy in Berlin, a member of the Institute for Advanced Study, Princeton, and a recipient of the Rome Prize from the American Academy in Rome. In 2010 he was Carlyle Lecturer in the History of Political Thought at the University of Oxford. In 2014 he was elected a Corresponding Fellow of the British Academy.

== Books ==
- The Humanism of Leonardo Bruni, 1987 (ed. and tr.), with Gordan Griffiths
- Supplementum Festivum: Studies in Honor of Paul Oskar Kristeller, 1987 (ed.), with John Monfasani and Frederick Purnell
- Plato in the Italian Renaissance, 2 vols., 1990
- Repertorium Brunianum: A Critical Guide to the Writings of Leonardo Bruni, vol. 1, 1997
- Renaissance Civic Humanism: Reappraisals and Reflections, 2000 (ed.)
- The Lost Continent: Neo-Latin Literature and the Birth of European Vernacular Literatures, 2001 (ed.)
- Leonardo Bruni: History of the Florentine People, 3 vols. 2001-7 (ed. and tr.)
- Marsilio Ficino: Platonic Theology, 6 vols., 2001-6 (ed.)
- Catalogus Translationum et Commentariorum, vols. 8 (2003) and 9 (2011), associate editor
- Humanism and Platonism in the Italian Renaissance, 2 vols., 2003-4
- Maffeo Vegio: Short Epics, 2004 (ed.), with Michael C. J. Putnam
- The Cambridge Companion to Renaissance Philosophy, 2007 (ed.)
- The Recovery of Ancient Philosophy in the Renaissance, 2008, with Ada Palmer
- Aurelio Lippo Brandolini: Republics and Kingdoms Compared, 2009 (ed. and tr.)
- Virtue Politics. Soulcraft and Statecraft in Renaissance Italy, 2019
- Political Meritocracy in Renaissance Italy: The Virtuous Republic of Francesco Patrizi of Siena, 2023
- The Golden Thread: A History of the Western Tradition, Volume I: The Ancient World and Christendom, 2025, with Allen C. Guelzo
- The Golden Thread: A History of the Western Tradition, Volume II: The Modern and Contemporary West, 2026, with Allen C. Guelzo
