= Golden thread =

Golden thread may refer to:

== Biology ==
- Nemipterus virgatus, or golden threadfin bream, a species of marine ray-finned fish
- Cuscuta pacifica, or goldenthread, a species of dodder plant
- Coptis trifolia, or threeleaf goldenthread, a circumboreal plant in the Buttercup family

== Law ==
- Golden thread (law), a legal judgment iterating the duty incumbent on the prosecution to prove the accused's guilt beyond a reasonable doubt

== Literature ==
- The Golden Thread (novel), the second book of the novel A Tale of Two Cities by Charles Dickens
- The Golden Thread: A History of the Western Tradition, a 2025 history book series by Allen C. Guelzo and James Hankins
- The Golden Thread: Esoteric Hitlerism, a 1978 book by Miguel Serrano
- The Golden Thread, a 1989 novel by Suzy McKee Charnas

== See also ==
- Gold thread
