= The I Tatti Renaissance Library =

Book series published by Harvard University Press

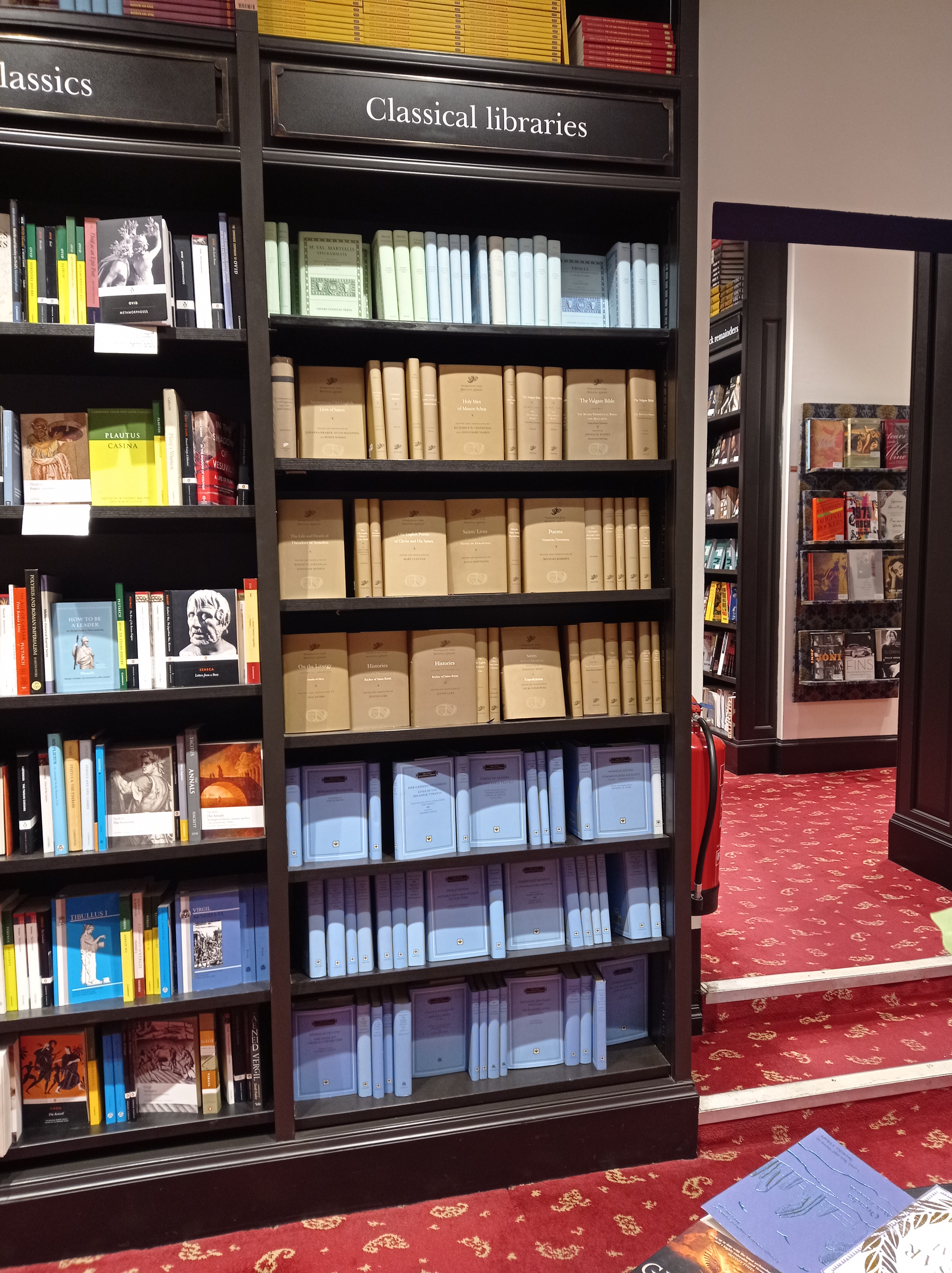
I Tatti volumes in a London bookshop

The I Tatti Renaissance Library is a book series published by Harvard University Press, which aims to present important works of Italian Renaissance Latin Literature to a modern audience by printing the original Latin text on each left-hand leaf (verso), and an English translation on the facing page (recto). The idea was initially conceived by Walter Kaiser, former professor of English and Comparative Literature at Harvard and director of the Villa I Tatti and James Hankins. Its goal is to be the Italian Renaissance version of the Loeb Classical Library. James Hankins, Professor of History at Harvard University, was the General Editor. Shane Butler was appointed as the new General Editor on November 1, 2025. As of 2021, the series had sold more than 100,000 copies. In March 2025, it published its 100th volume.

Many of the books in the series have never been translated into English before, and the series promises to increase the understanding of the Renaissance among the general public and non-specialist historians by making primary sources accessible, thus giving a window into the minds of Renaissance thinkers themselves.

The books of The I Tatti Renaissance Library have a consistent appearance: a pale blue cover, analogous to the red (Latin) or green (Greek) books in the Loeb Classical Library. They are, however, closer in size to a standard hardcover book than to the pocket-sized books of the Loeb series. A typeface named "ITRL", based on the work of Renaissance typographer Nicolas Jenson, was specially designed for the series. The books are notable for their overall readability. Anthony Grafton said of the Latin texts: "though not full, critical editions, [they] are correct, well punctuated and readable. The English translations have an unusual clarity, elegance and precision".

The series is named after the Villa I Tatti in Florence, which houses the Center for Italian Renaissance Studies of Harvard University.

== Publication history ==
- Famous Women, Giovanni Boccaccio, ed. and trans. Virginia Brown, 2001
  - Paperback available in 2003
- History of the Florentine People, Volume 1, Leonardo Bruni, ed. and trans. James Hankins, 2001
  - Volume 2 available in 2004
  - Volume 3 available in 2007, trans. James Hankins and D.J.W. Bradley
- Platonic Theology, Volume 1, Marsilio Ficino, ed. James Hankins, trans. Michael J.B. Allen, 2001
  - Volume 2 available in 2002
  - Volume 3 available in 2003
  - Volume 4 available in 2004
  - Volume 5 available in 2005
  - Volume 6 available in 2006
- Humanist Educational Treatises, ed. and trans. Craig W. Kallendorf, 2002
  - Paperback available in 2008
- On Discovery, Polydore Vergil, ed. and trans. Brian P. Copenhaver, 2002
- Biographical Writings, Giannozzo Manetti, ed. and trans. Stefano U. Baldassarri and Rolf Bagemihl, 2003
- Momus, Leon Battista Alberti, ed. Virginia Brown, ed. and trans. Sarah Knight, 2003
- Commentaries, Volume 1, Pius II, ed. Margaret Meserve and Marcello Simonetta, 2004
  - Volume 2 available in 2007
  - Volume 3 available in 2018
- Invectives, Francesco Petrarca, ed. and trans. David Marsh, 2004
  - Paperback available in 2008
- Later Travels, Cyriac of Ancona, ed. and trans. Edward W. Bodnar, 2004
- Short Epics, Maffeo Vegio, ed. and trans. James Hankins and Michael C.J. Putnam, 2004
- Silvae, Angelo Poliziano, ed. and trans. Charles Fantazzi, 2004
- Humanist Comedies, ed. and trans. Gary R. Grund, 2005
- Italy Illuminated, Volume 1: Books I-IV, Flavio Biondo, ed. and trans. Jeffrey A. White, 2005
  - Volume 2: Books V–VIII, 2016
- Lyric Poetry. Etna, Pietro Bembo, ed. and trans. Mary P. Chatfield, trans. Betty Radice, 2005
- Baiae, Giovanni Gioviano Pontano, ed. and trans. Dennis G. Rodney, 2006
- Letters, Volume 1, Angelo Poliziano, ed. and trans. Shane Butler, 2006
- Baldo, Volume 1, Teofilo Folengo, ed. and trans. Ann E. Mullaney, 2007
  - Volume 2 available in 2008
- Ciceronian Controversies, ed. Joann Dellaneva, trans. Brian Duvick, 2007
- History of Venice, Volume 1, Pietro Bembo, ed. and trans. Robert W. Ulery, Jr., 2007
  - Volume 2 available in 2008
  - Volume 3 available in 2009
- On The Donation of Constantine, Lorenzo Valla, ed. and trans. G. W. Bowersock, 2007
  - Paperback available in 2008
- Commentaries on Plato, Volume 1: Phaedrus and Ion, Marsilio Ficino, ed. and trans. Michael J. B. Allen, 2008
  - Volume 2: Parmenides, Part 1, ed. and trans. Maude Vanhaelen, 2012
  - Volume 2: Parmenides, Part 2, ed. and trans. Maude Vanhaelen, 2012
- Essays and Dialogues, Bartolomeo Scala, ed. and trans. Renee Neu Watkins, 2008
- Lives of the Popes, Volume 1: Antiquity, Bartolomeo Platina, ed. and trans. Anthony F. d' Elia, 2008
- Poems, Cristoforo Landino, ed. and trans. Mary P. Chatfield, 2008
- Writings on Church and Reform, Nicholas of Cusa, ed. and trans. Thomas M. Izbicki, 2008
- Christiad, Marco Girolamo Vida, ed. and trans. James Gardner, 2009
- Latin Poetry, Jacopo Sannazaro, ed. and trans. Michael C. J. Putnam, 2009
- Odes, Francesco Filelfo, ed. and trans. Diana Robin, 2009
- Republics and Kingdoms Compared, Aurelio Lippo Brandolini, ed. and trans. James Hankins, 2009
- Book on Music, Florentius de Faxolis, ed. and trans. Bonnie J. Blackburn and Leofranc Holford-Strevens, 2010
- The Hermaphrodite, Antonio Beccadelli, ed. and trans. Holt Parker, 2010
- Sacred Painting. Museum, Federico Borromeo, ed. and trans. Kenneth S. Rothwell, Jr., 2010
- Genealogy of the Pagan Gods, Volume 1: Books I–V, Giovanni Boccaccio, ed. and trans. Jon Solomon, 2011
  - Volume 2: Books VI–X, 2017
- Humanist Tragedies, ed. and trans. Gary R. Grund, 2011
- Letters to Friends, Bartolomeo Fonzio, ed. Alessandro Daneloni, trans. Martin Davies, 2011
- Modern Poets, Lilio Gregorio Giraldi, ed. and trans. John N. Grant, 2011
- Dialectical Disputations, Volume 1: Book I, Lorenzo Valla, ed. and trans. Brian P. Copenhaver and Lodi Nauta, 2012
  - Volume 2: Books II-III, 2012
- Dialogues, Volume 1: Charon and Antoninus, Giovanni Pontano, ed. and trans. Julia Haig Gaisser, 2012
  - Volume 2: Actius, 2020
  - Volume 3: Aegidius and Asinus, 2020
- Poems, Michael Tarchaniota Marullus, trans. Charles Fantazzi, 2012
- Latin Poetry, Girolamo Fracastoro, trans. James Gardner, 2013
- Notable Men and Women of Our Time, Paolo Giovio, ed. and trans. Kenneth Gouwens, 2013
- On Exile, Francesco Filelfo, ed. Jeroen De Keyser, trans. W. Scott Blanchard, 2013
- On Methods, Volume 1: Books I-II, Jacopo Zabarella, ed. and trans. John P. McCaskey, 2013
  - Volume 2: Books III-IV. On Regressus, 2014
- On the World and Religious Life, Coluccio Salutati, trans. Tina Marshall 2014
- On Married Life. Eridanus, Giovanni Gioviano Pontano, trans. Roman Luke 2014
- The Lepanto Battel, ed. and trans. Elizabeth R. Wright, Sarah Spence, Andrew Lemons, 2014
- Political Writings, Coluccio Salutati, ed. Stefano U. Baldassarri, trans. Rolf Bagemihl,, 2014
- Correspondence, Lorenzo Valla, ed. and trans. Brendan Cook, 2014
- Life and Early Travels, Cyriacus of Ancona, ed. and trans. Charles Mitchell, Edward W. Bodnar, Clive Foss, 2015
- On Dionysius the Areopagite, Volume 1: Mystical Theology and The Divine Names, Part I, Marsilio Ficino, ed. and trans. Michael J. B. Allen, 2015
  - Volume 2: The Divine Names, Part II, 2015
- Apologetic Writings, Girolamo Savonarola, ed. and trans. M. Michèle Mulchahey, 2015
- Fiammetta. Paradise, Ugolino Verino, ed. and trans. Allan M. Wilson, 2016
- The Greek Classics, Aldus Manutius, ed. and trans. N. G. Wilson, 2016
- A Translator’s Defense, Giannozzo Manetti, ed. Myron McShane, trans. Mark Young, 2016
- My Secret Book, Petrarch, ed. and trans. Nicholas Mann, 2016
- Angelinetum and Other Poems, Giovanni Marrasio, trans. Mary P. Chatfield, 2016
- Rome in Triumph, Volume 1: Books I–II, Flavio Biondo, ed. Maria Agata Pincelli, trans. Frances Muecke, 2016
- Selected Letters, Volume 1, Petrarch, trans. Elaine Fantham, 2017
  - Volume 2 available in 2017
- Humanism and the Latin Classics, Aldus Manutius, ed. and trans. John N. Grant, 2017
- Against the Jews and the Gentiles: Books I–IV, Giannozzo Manetti, ed. Stefano U. Baldassarri, Daniela Pagliara, trans. David Marsh, 2017
- Commentary on Plotinus, Volume 4: Ennead III, Part 1, Marsilio Ficino, ed. and trans. Stephen Gersh, 2017
  - Volume 5: Ennead III, Part 2, and Ennead IV, 2018
- Latin Poetry, Ludovico Ariosto, ed. and trans. Dennis Looney, D. Mark Possanza, 2018
- On Human Worth and Excellence, Giannozzo Manetti, ed. and trans. Brian P. Copenhaver, 2019
- Greek and Latin Poetry, Poliziano, ed. and trans. Peter E. Knox, 2019
- The Virtues and Vices of Speech, Giovanni Pontano, ed. and trans. G. W. Pigman III, 2019
- Lives of the Milanese Tyrants, Pier Candido Decembrio, ed. Massimo Zaggia, trans. Gary Ianziti, 2019
- Miscellanies, Volume 1, Poliziano, ed. and trans. Andrew R. Dyck, Alan Cottrell, 2020
  - Volume 2 available in 2020
- Life of Giovanni Pico della Mirandola. Oration, Giovanni Francesco Pico della Mirandola, Giovanni Pico della Mirandola, ed. and trans. Brian P. Copenhaver with Michael J. B. Allen, 2022
- Eclogues. Garden of the Hesperides, Giovanni Pontano, ed. and trans. Luke Roman, 2022
- Portraits of Learned Men, Paolo Giovio, ed. and trans. Kenneth Gouwens, 2023
- Biographical and Autobiographical Writings, Leon Battista Alberti, trans. Martin McLaughlin, 2023
- On Leaders and Tyrants, Poggio Bracciolini, Guarino of Verona, and Pietro del Monte, ed. and trans. Hester Schadee, Keith Sidwell with David Rundle, 2024
- Dinner Pieces, Volume 1 and Dinner Pieces, Volume 2, Leon Battista Alberti, ed. Roberto Cardini, trans. David Marsh, 2024
- Latin Pastoral Poetry, Andrea Navagero, Marcantonio Flaminio, ed. and trans. Allan M. Wilson, 2025
- 900 Conclusions, Giovanni Pico della Mirandola, ed. and trans. Brian P. Copenhaver, 2025
- Commentary on Plotinus, Volume 1: Ennead I, Marsilio Ficino, ed. and trans. Stephen Gersh, 2026
