= Brian Copenhaver =

American philosopher (born 1942)

Dr. Brian P. Copenhaver
- Born: December 21, 1942 (age 83); Baltimore, Maryland, USA
- Awards: Udvar-Hazy Chair as Distinguished Professor of Philosophy and History at the University of California (2011-2018)

Education
- Education: The University of Kansas (Ph.D.), Creighton University, Loyola College

Philosophical work
- Notable works: Hermetica: The Greek Corpus Hermeticum and the Latin Asclepius in English Translation, with Notes and Introduction (Cambridge: Cambridge University Press, 1991)

Brian P. Copenhaver (born December 21, 1942) is Distinguished Professor Emeritus of Philosophy and History at The University of California, Los Angeles. He teaches and writes about philosophy, religion and science in late medieval and early modern Europe.

== Career ==
Copenhaver was educated at Loyola College (Baltimore), Creighton University and The University of Kansas, before doing post-doctoral studies at the Warburg Institute. He is a Fellow of the American Academy of Arts and Sciences, past President of the Journal of the History of Philosophy and a member of the Council of the Instituto Nazionale di Studi sul Rinascimento in Italy. He serves or has served on the boards of Renaissance Quarterly, Annals of Science, the Journal of the History of Ideas, Early Science and Medicine, the International Archives of the History of Ideas, and the I Tatti Renaissance Library. He was the charter co-editor of Magic, Ritual and Witchcraft, and was the Editor of the History of Philosophy Quarterly, His research has been supported by the Guggenheim Foundation, the Getty Trust, the American Council of Learned Societies, the American Philosophical Society, the Medieval Academy of America and by a Fulbright Scholarship.

In 2024, he won the Constantine Panunzio Distinguished Emeriti Award.

== Scholarship ==
Copenhaver studies magic and related beliefs and practices: astrology, demonology, divination, Kabbalah – as parts of normative philosophy and science as they were a few centuries ago. His research shows that magic and other "occult" beliefs and practices were supported primarily by the philosophy and science of Aristotle and Aristotelian scholasticism, which dominated European culture from the thirteenth through the seventeenth centuries. When confidence in Aristotelianism collapsed in the seventeenth century, magic and its attendant beliefs collapsed with it as serious issues for Europe's leading thinkers.

He also studies the ancient Greek and Latin Hermetica, writings from late antiquity ascribed by Renaissance scholars to an ancient Egyptian god, Thoth, whose Greek name is Hermes Trismegistus. Although this legendary Hermes has often been identified as a divine patron of magic, Copenhaver has shown that the Greek Hermetic texts recovered in the fifteenth century by Marsilio Ficino are not about magic: their topic is a religious practice aiming at personal salvation.

Copenhaver's work on Giovanni Pico della Mirandola and Lorenzo Valla, both famed as Renaissance humanists, goes in two very different directions: Pico as the inventor of Christian Kabbalah; Valla as the scourge of scholastic logic. Copenhaver shows that Pico's famous Oration on the Dignity of Man is not about the dignity of man. (Pico did not give it that title.) Instead, the speech is a manifesto for ascetic mysticism, urging the pious to abandon the body and escape the material world through magic and Kabbalah. Like Pico, Valla was a master of the Latin language and an acute student of philosophy. Unlike Pico, Valla had little influence on his time and place through the work that Copenhaver has studied, the Dialectical Disputations, whose main target is Peter of Spain's Summary of Logic, written in the thirteenth century but still Europe's leading textbook of logic when Valla wrote his Disputations. Although Valla's contemporaries paid little attention to it, his Disputations foreshadows what we now call "philosophy of language".

Both Valla and Pico lived during a great era of Italian intellectual life, starting with Dante, Petrarch and Boccaccio in the fourteenth century and ending with Giordano Bruno, Tommaso Campanella and Galileo in the seventeenth century. In the nineteenth century, Italian philosophers worked out the grand narrative of Italian thought in this earlier period – the Renaissance – and afterward: the construction of this story as an artifact of modern Italian politics, especially the Risorgimento and the Fascist regime, is another topic that Copenhaver has explored. The perspective of his work on Descartes is unusual, emphasizing pictorial innovations in early modern philosophy. Copenhaver maintains that the history of philosophy must be no less historical than philosophical.

== Contributions to higher education ==
During his ten years as Provost of UCLA’s College of Letters and Science, Copenhaver led successful efforts to revamp UCLA’s General Education curriculum, implement a stronger writing requirement and make the Internet and Web technology an integral part of academic life for students and faculty. He was also instrumental in the College’s fund-raising campaign, spearheading landmark donations like the multi-million dollar Wasserman gift. On his watch, UCLA’s College became the first in the country to establish a website – supported by student fees – for every undergraduate course. In response to the September 11 attacks, he worked with Vice-Provost Judi Smith to design the first offering of UCLA’s renowned Fiat Lux courses, and to recruit faculty to teach them on short notice. Copenhaver is currently teaching his own online course, while advising other faculty and staff about this new – and controversial – way to teach and learn.

== Published works ==
Copenhaver's articles examine magic, astrology, the Hermetica, Kabbalah and their foundations in Neoplatonic, Aristotelian and scholastic philosophy; natural philosophy; scepticism; Averroism; philosophical translation; modern Italian philosophy; historiography; the classical tradition in philosophy; Lorenzo Valla; Marsilio Ficino; Giovanni Pico della Mirandola; Polydore Vergil; Tommaso Campanella; Isaac Newton; Henry More; and Benedetto Croce. His books include:

- Symphorien Champier and the Reception of the Occultist Tradition in Renaissance France (The Hague: Mouton, 1978)
- Pseudomagia: A Neo-Latin Drama by William Mewe (Nieuwkoop: De Graaf, 1979), with John Coldewey
- Thomas Watson, Antigone; William Alabaster, Roxana; Peter Mease, Adrastus Parentans sive Vindicta, Renaissance Latin Drama in England, Ser. 2.4, (Hildesheim: Olms, 1987), with John Coldewey
- William Mewe, Pseudomagia; Aquila Cruso, Euribates Pseudomagus; John Chappell, Susenbrotus or Fortunia, Zelotypus, Renaissance Latin Drama in England, Ser. 2.14 (Hildesheim: Olms, 1991), with John Coldewey
- Hermetica: The Greek Corpus Hermeticum and the Latin Asclepius in English Translation, with Notes and Introduction (Cambridge: Cambridge University Press, 1991)
- A History of Western Philosophy, III: Renaissance Philosophy (Oxford: Oxford University Press, 1992); with Charles Schmitt
- Polydore Vergil, On Discovery, The I Tatti Renaissance Library (Harvard University Press, 2002)
- From Kant to Croce: Modern Philosophy in Italy, 1800-1950, The Lorenzo da Ponte Library (University of Toronto Press, 2012), with Rebecca Copenhaver
- Lorenzo Valla, Dialectical Disputations, The I Tatti Renaissance Library (Cambridge: Harvard University Press, 2012), with Lodi Nauta
- Peter of Spain, Summaries of Logic: Text, Translation, Introduction and Notes (Oxford: Oxford University Press, 2013), with Calvin Normore and Terry Parsons
- The Book of Magic: From Antiquity to the Enlightenment (London: Penguin, 2015)
- Magic in Western Culture: From Antiquity to the Enlightenment (Cambridge: Cambridge University Press, 2015)
- Magic and the Dignity of Man: Pico della Mirandola and his Oration in Modern Memory (Cambridge: Harvard University Press, 2019)
- Giannozzo Manetti, On Human Worth and Excellence, The I Tatti Renaissance Library (Cambridge: Harvard University Press, 2019)
- Life of Giovanni Pico della Mirandola. Oration, The I Tatti Renaissance Library (Cambridge: Harvard University Press, 2022), with Michael J. B. Allen
- Pico della Mirandola on Trial, (Oxford: Oxford University Press, 2022)
- Giovanni Pico della Mirandola, 900 Conclusions, The I Tatti Renaissance Library (Cambridge: Harvard University Press, 2025)
- Philosophy as Descartes Found It: Practice and Theory, (Oxford: Oxford University Press, 2025)
