= Kristeller =

Kristeller is a German surname. Notable people with the surname include:

- Paul Kristeller (1863–1931), German art historian
- Paul Oskar Kristeller (1905–1999), German-born American historian of philosophy
- Samuel Kristeller (1820–1900), German gynaecologist

== See also ==
- Kristeller (grape), another name for the German wine grape Elbling
