= Dioscorides =

Greek pharmacologist (1st century AD)

Pedanius Dioscorides
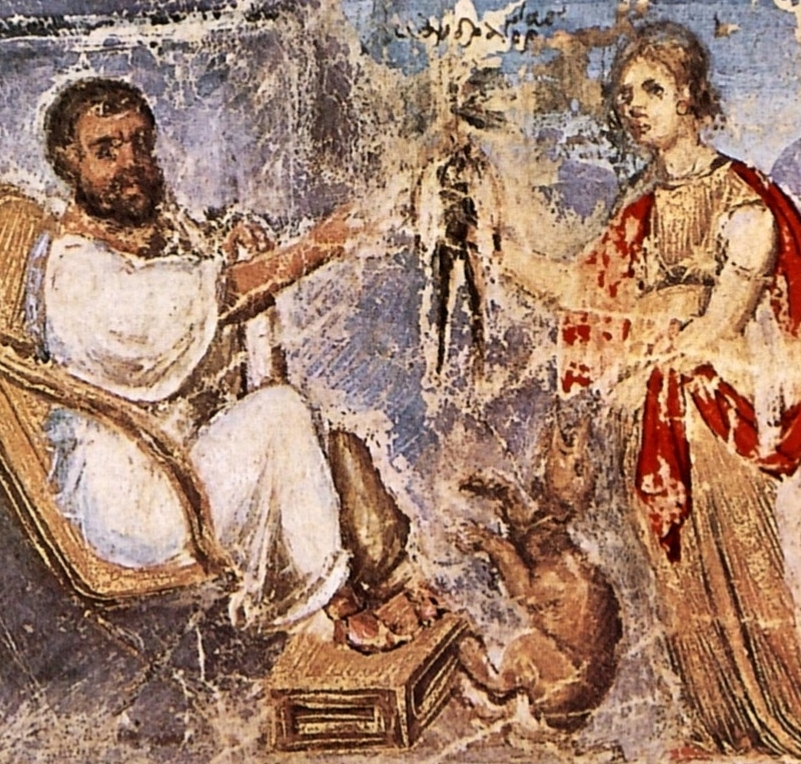
- Dioscorides receives a mandrake root, an illumination from the 6th century (c. 512) Greek Juliana Anicia Codex (detail)
- Born: c. 40 AD; Anazarbus, Cilicia, Asia Minor
- Died: c. 90 AD
- Other name: Dioscurides
- Occupations: Army physician, pharmacologist, botanist
- Known for: De Materia Medica

Pedanius Dioscorides (Ancient Greek: Πεδάνιος Διοσκουρίδης, Pedánios Dioskourídēs; c. 40–90 AD), known as "the father of pharmacognosy", was a Greek pharmacologist, physician, botanist, and author of De materia medica (in the original Ancient Greek: Περὶ ὕλης ἰατρικῆς, Peri hulēs iatrikēs, both meaning "On Medical Material"), a 5-volume Greek encyclopedic pharmacopeia on herbal medicine and related medicinal substances. Which was widely read for more than 1,500 years. For almost two millennia Dioscorides was regarded as the most prominent writer on plants and plant drugs.

== Life ==
A native of Anazarbus, Cilicia, Asia Minor, Dioscorides likely studied medicine nearby at the school in Tarsus, which had a pharmacological emphasis, and he dedicated his medical books to Laecanius Arius, a medical practitioner there. (Note: The dedication, translated by Scarborough and Nutton, began "At your insistence I have assembled my material into five books, and I dedicate my compendium to you in fulfilment of a debt of gratitude for your sentiments towards me".) Though he writes that he lived a "soldier's life" or "soldier-like life", his pharmacopeia refers almost solely to plants found in the Greek-speaking eastern Mediterranean, suggesting that he accompanied military campaigns or travelled in a civilian capacity, but less widely than sometimes supposed. The name Pedanius is Roman, suggesting that an aristocrat of that name sponsored him to become a Roman citizen.

== De materia medica ==
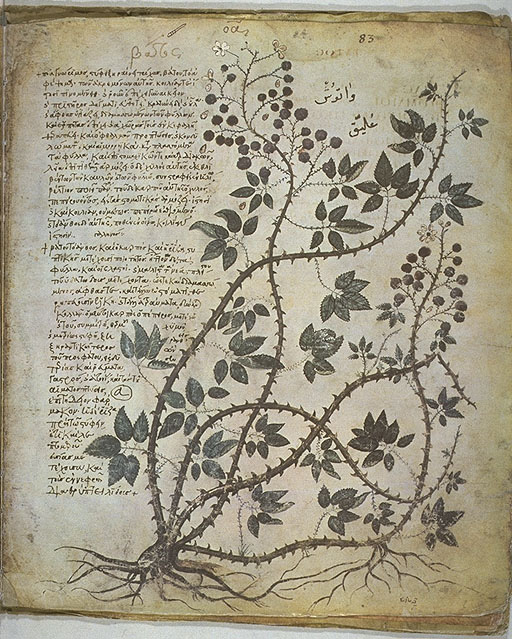
Blackberry from the 6th-century Vienna Dioscurides manuscript

Between 50 and 70 AD Dioscorides wrote a five-volume book in his native Greek, Περὶ ὕλης ἰατρικῆς (Perì hylēs íatrikēs), known in Western Europe more often by its Latin title De materia medica ("On Medical Material"), which became the precursor to all modern pharmacopeias.

In contrast to many classical authors, Dioscorides' works were not "rediscovered" in the Renaissance, because his book had never left circulation; indeed, with regard to Western materia medica through the early modern period, Dioscorides' text eclipsed the Hippocratic corpus.

In the medieval period, De materia medica was circulated in Greek, as well as Latin and Arabic translation.

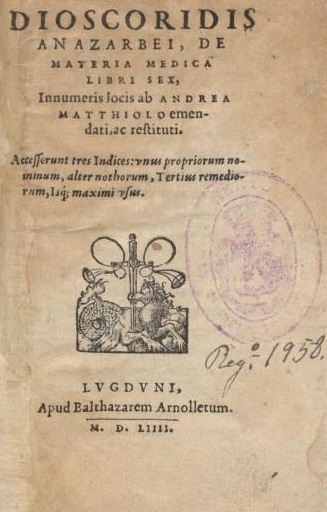
Cover of an early printed version of De materia medica, Lyon, 1554

While being reproduced in manuscript form through the centuries, it was often supplemented with commentary and minor additions from Arabic and Indian sources. Ibn al-Baitar's commentary on Dioscorides' De materia medica, entitled Tafsīr Kitāb Diāsqūrīdūs: تفسير كتاب دياسقوريدوس, has been used by scholars to identify many of the flora mentioned by Dioscorides.

A number of illustrated manuscripts of De materia medica survive. The most famous of these is the lavishly illustrated Vienna Dioscurides, produced in Constantinople in 512/513 AD. Densely illustrated Arabic copies survive from the 12th and 13th centuries, while Greek manuscripts survive today in the monasteries of Mount Athos.

De materia medica is the prime historical source of information about the medicines used by the Greeks, Romans, and other cultures of antiquity. The work also records the Dacian, Thracian, Roman, ancient Egyptian and North African (Carthaginian) names for some plants, which otherwise would have been lost. The work presents about 600 plants in all, although the descriptions are sometimes obscurely phrased, leading to comments such as: "Numerous individuals from the Middle Ages on have struggled with the identity of the recondite kinds", while some of the botanical identifications of Dioscorides' plants remain merely guesses.

John Goodyer translated the work into English in 1655, and bequeathed it to Magdalen College, Oxford; it was published by the Oxford University Press in 1934.

== Legacy ==
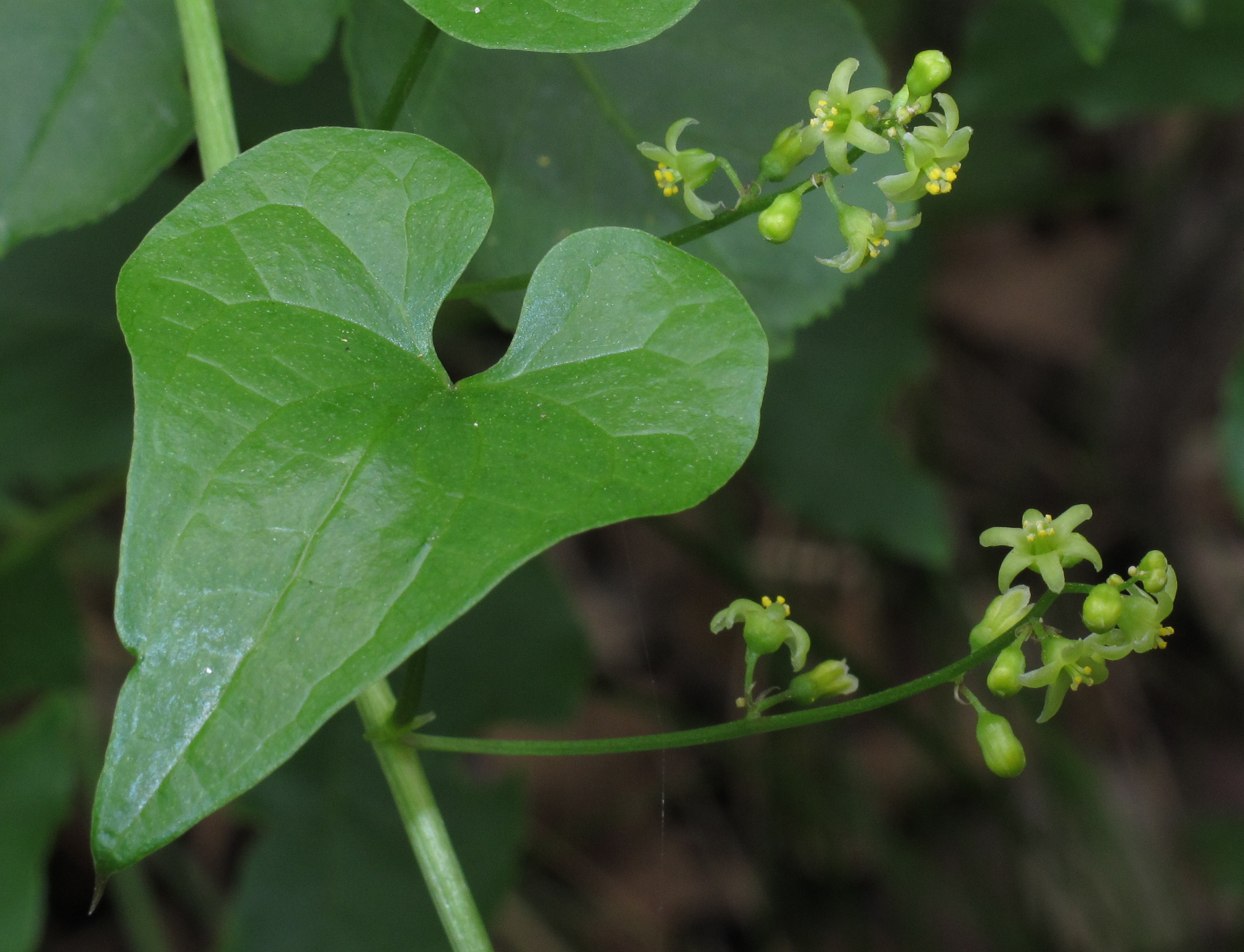
The genus Dioscorea includes different species of yam.

De materia medica formed the core of the European pharmacopeia through the 19th century, suggesting that "the timelessness of Dioscorides' work resulted from an empirical tradition based on trial and error; that it worked for generation after generation despite social and cultural changes and changes in medical theory".

The plant genus Dioscorea, which includes the yam, was named after him by Linnaeus.

A butterfly, the bush hopper, Ampittia dioscorides which is found from India southeast towards Indonesia and east towards China, is named after him.

== Gallery ==
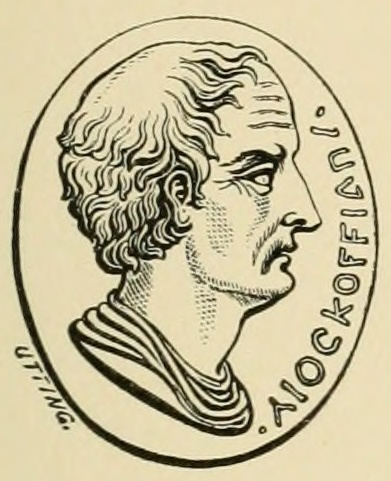
Portrait of an old man; perhaps the physician Dioscorides, whose name is cut in front of it; antique paste

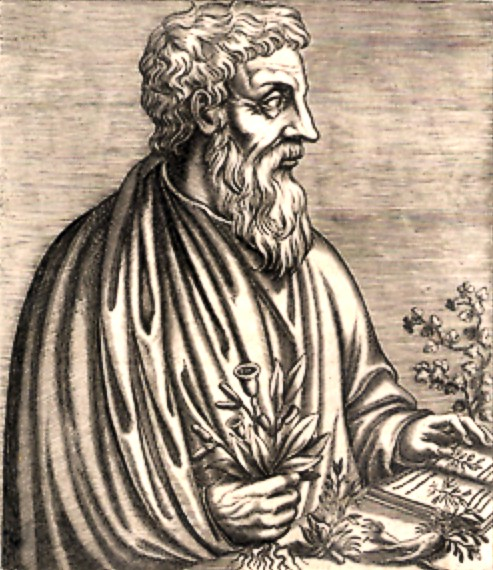
Later representation of Dioscorides

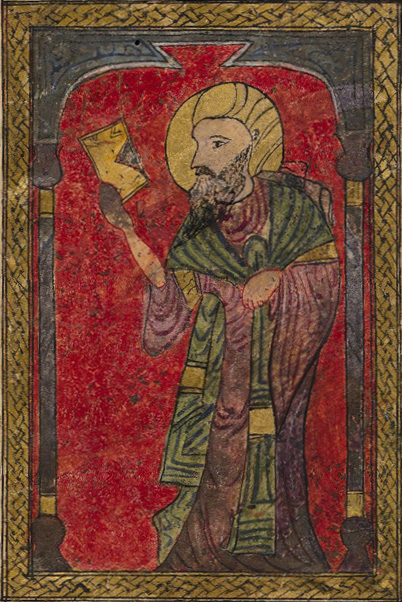
In a 1240 Arabic edition of De materia medica

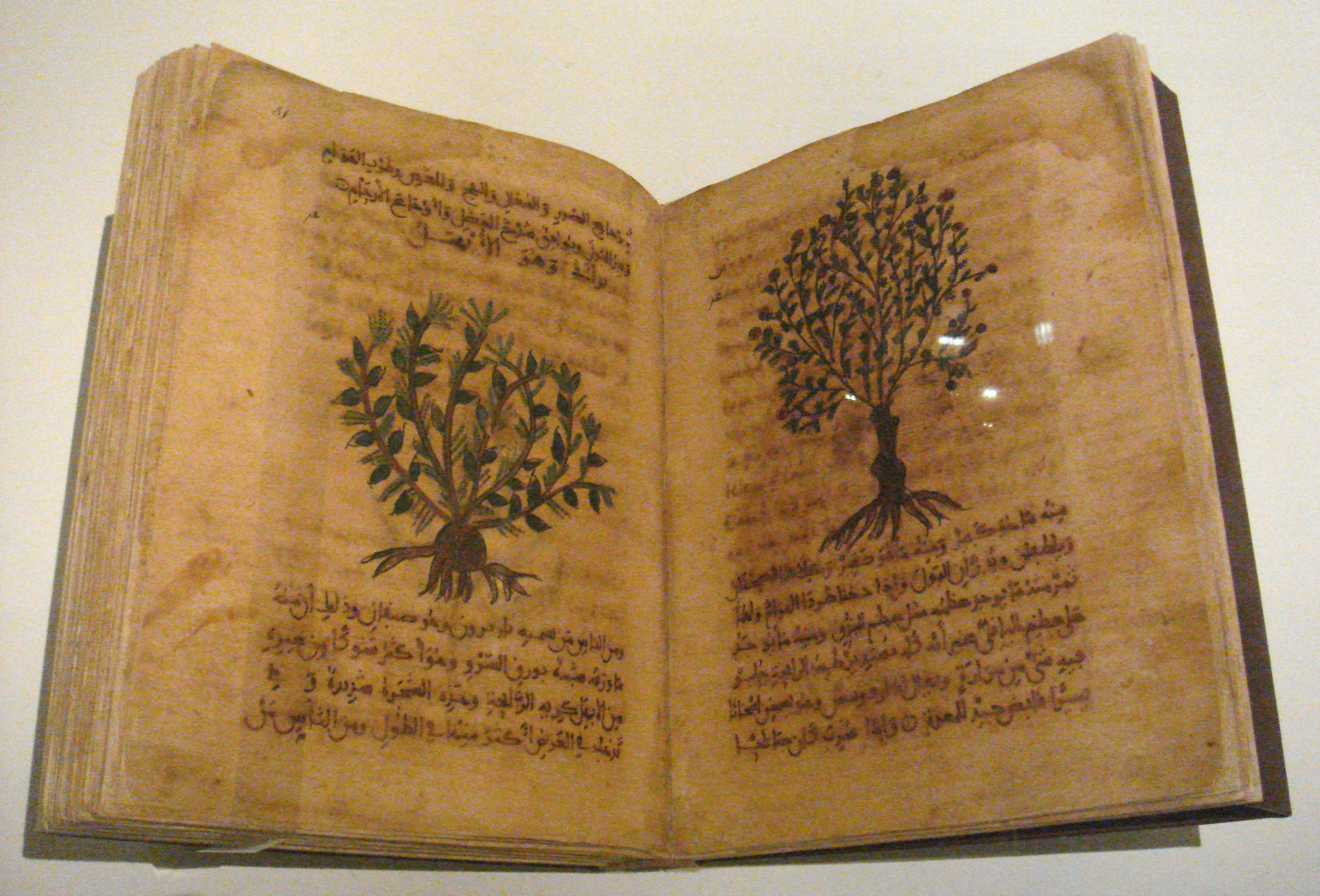
De materia medica in Arabic, Spain, 12th–13th century

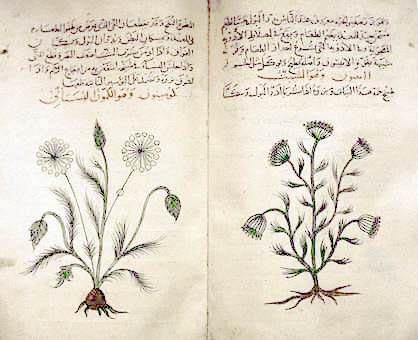
Cumin and dill from an Arabic book of simples (c. 1334) after Dioscorides (British Museum)

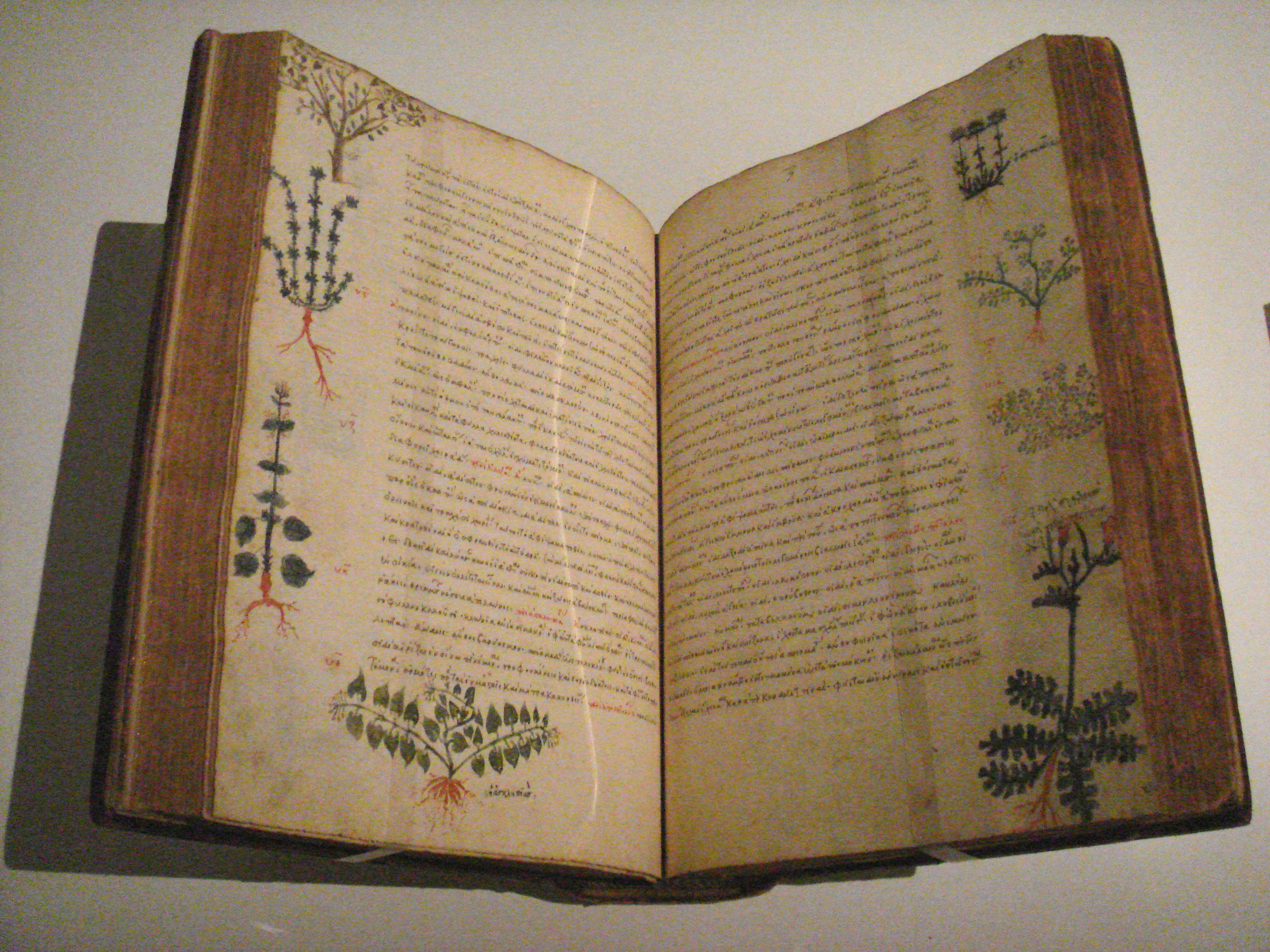
Byzantine De materia medica, 15th century

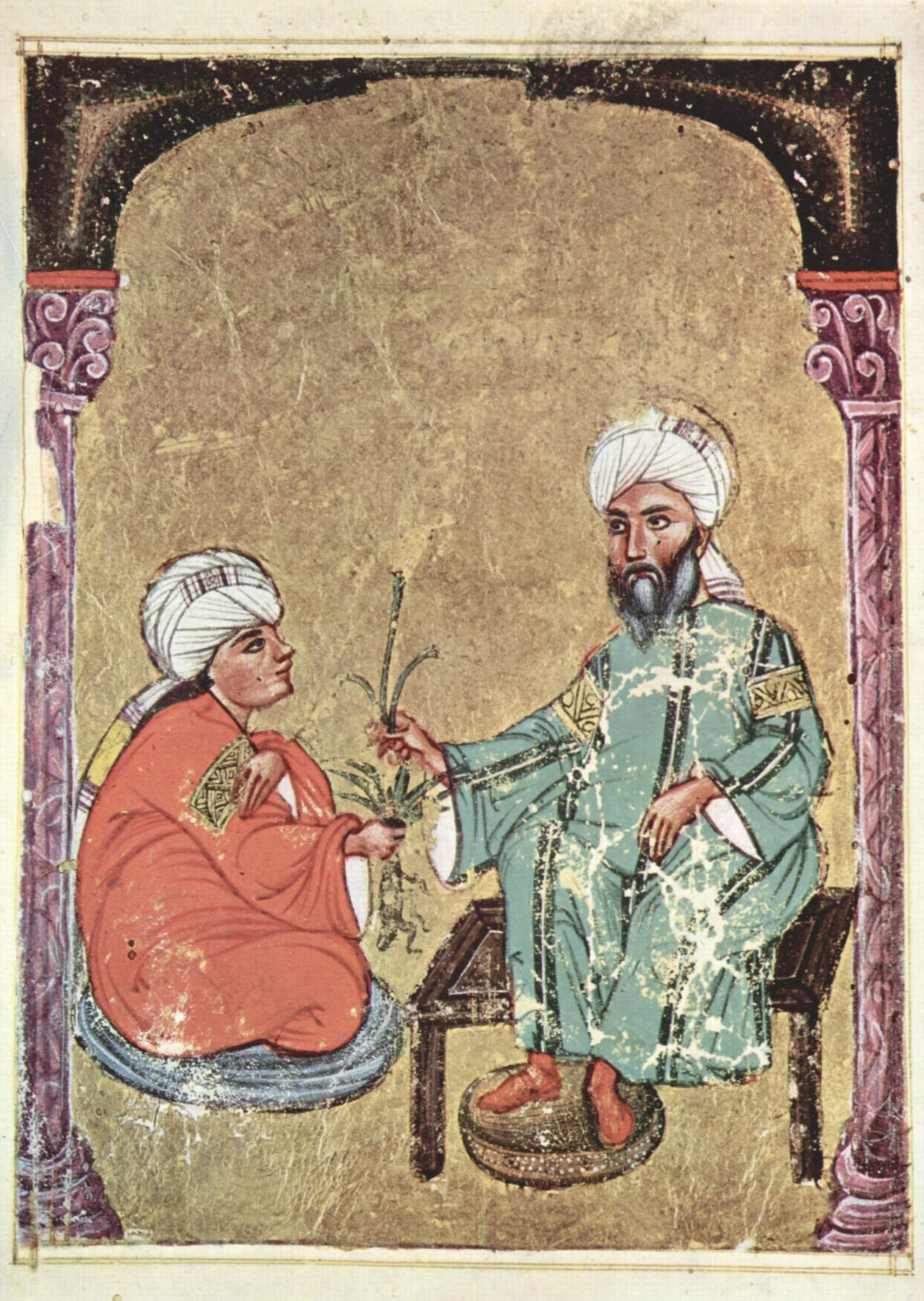
Folio from an Arabic manuscript of Dioscorides, De materia medica, 1229

== Translations ==
- De Materia Medica: Being an Herbal with many other medicinal materials. Translated by Tess Anne Osbaldeston. Based on the 1655 translation of John Goodyer. Johannesburg: Ibidis Press. 2000 – via cancerlynx.com.
- De Materia Medica. Translated by Lily Y. Beck. Hildesheim, Germany: Olms-Weidmann. 2005.
- Gunther, R. W. T., ed. (1933) [1655]. The Greek Herbal of Dioscorides. Translated by John Goodyer.
- De Materia Medica : libri V Eiusdem de Venenis Libri duo. Translated by Iano Antonio Saraceno Lugdunaeo (aka: Janus Antonius Saracenus). 1598 – via digitale-sammlungen.de.

== See also ==
- Materia medica
- Dioscorea

== Sources ==
- Allbutt, T. Clifford (1921). Greek medicine in Rome. London: Macmillan. ISBN 1-57898-631-1.
- Bruins: Codex Constantinopolitanus: Palatii Veteris NO. 1 [3 volume set] Part 1: Reproduction of the Manuscript; Part 2: Greek Text; Part 3: Translation and Commentary Bruins, E. M. (Ed.)
- Forbes, Andrew; Henley, Daniel; Henley, David (2013). 'Pedanius Dioscorides' in: Health and Well Being: A Medieval Guide. Chiang Mai: Cognoscenti Books.
- Hamilton, J. S. (1986). "Scribonius Largus on the medical profession". Bulletin of the History of Medicine. 60 (2): 209–216. PMID 3521772.
- Lazris, J.; Stavros, V. (2013). "L'image paradigmatique: des Schémas anatomiques d'Aristote au De materia medica de Dioscoride". Pallas. 93 (93): 131–164. doi:10.4000/pallas.1400.
- Lazris, J.; Stavros, V. "The medical illustration in Antiquity". Reality Through Image: 18–23 (abstract).
- Riddle, John (1980). "Dioscorides" (PDF). Catalogus Translationum et Commentariorum. 4: 1.
- Riddle, John M. (1985). Dioscorides on pharmacy and medicine. Austin: University of Texas Press. ISBN 0-292-71544-7.
- Sadek, M. M. (1983). The Arabic materia medica of Dioscorides. Québec, Canada: Les Éditions du sphinx. ISBN 2-920123-02-5.
- Scarborough, J.; Nutton, V. (1982). "The Preface of Dioscorides' Materia Medica: introduction, translation, and commentary". Transactions & Studies of the College of Physicians of Philadelphia. 4 (3): 187–227. PMID 6753260.
