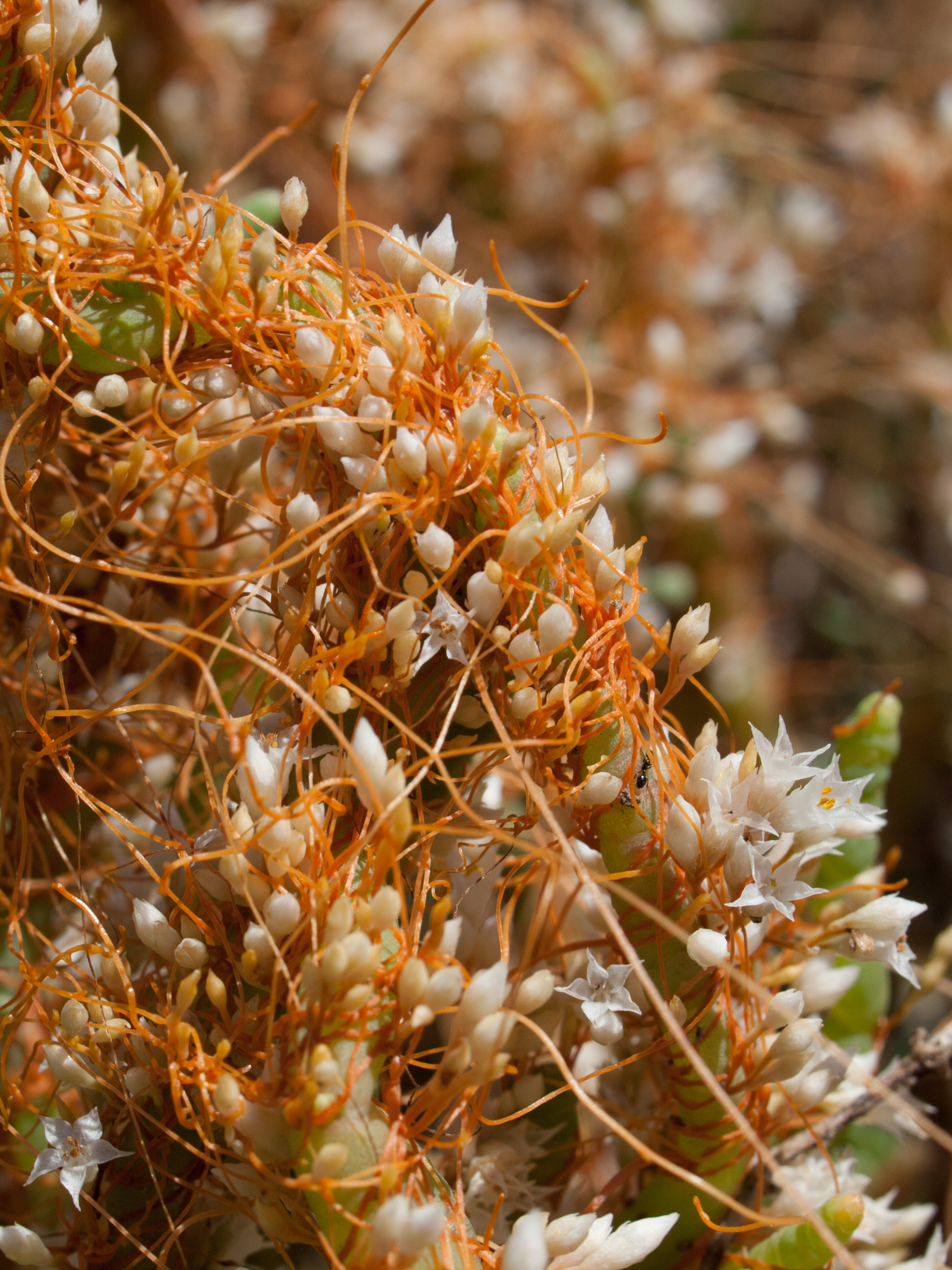

Scientific classification
- Kingdom: Plantae
- Clade: Embryophytes
- Clade: Tracheophytes
- Clade: Spermatophytes
- Clade: Angiosperms
- Clade: Eudicots
- Clade: Asterids
- Order: Solanales
- Family: Convolvulaceae
- Genus: Cuscuta
- Species: C. salina

Binomial name
- Cuscuta salina Engelm.

= Cuscuta salina =

Species of flowering plant

Cuscuta salina is a species of dodder known by the English name salt marsh dodder and is a native plant of western North America. The habitat includes coastal tidal wetlands in California, as well as saline habitats away from the coast, such as vernal pools and salt flats. Salt Marsh Dodder is a parasitic plant, wrapping orange-colored stems around natural wetland vegetation and absorbing nutrients of host plants via their specialized structures called haustoria.

== Description ==
Cuscuta salina is a slender annual vine extending yellowish thready stems to wrap tightly around other plants of the sunflower family, notably Jaumea carnosa in an ecological mutualistic relationship. The leaves are rudimentary and scale-like, virtually non-existent, as the plant has lost all ability to do photosynthesis due to no green leaves and no green stems. Salt Marsh Dodder flowers are white glandular corollas. Each flower is bell-shaped with five pointed triangular lobes, after pollination by many kinds of native bees and native butterflies, develop fruits that sweet and edible to small native mammals and native birds, including the Belding's Savannah Sparrow.

== Taxonomy ==
Previous treatments of the species divided it into three varieties. In 2009, two of them were combined into a separate species called Cuscuta pacifica. The two species can easily be differentiated by habitat geography: the varieties of Cuscuta pacifica grow solely in coastal habitats while Cuscuta salina sensu stricto grows inland in alkaline or saline seasonally wet habitats such as vernal pools and salt flats, such as the margins of the Great Salt Lake.
