= Republics and Kingdoms Compared =

Italian political treatise

- Author: Aurelio Lippo Brandolini
- Original title: De comparatione rei publicae et regni
- Language: Latin
- Series: None
- Subject: Political philosophy
- Publication date: 1492/94
- Publication place: Italy
- English publication date: 2009
- Media type: Print

Republics and Kingdoms Compared is a work of political philosophy by Italian Humanist Aurelio Lippo Brandolini. Dedicated to Mattias Corvinus, the treatise was never printed during the Renaissance and survived only in two manuscript copies.

== Summary ==
Republics and Kingdoms Compared is a Socratic dialogue set in the court of King Mattias Corvinus of Hungary, and is Perhaps the only Socratic dialogue written by an Italian humanist. The work depicts a debate between the king himself, his illegitimate son Prince János (John Corvinus), and Florentine knight and merchant Domenico Giugni. Corvinus assumes the role Plato and Xenophon traditionally assigned to Socrates in Brandolini's dialogue.

In framing Republics and Kingdoms Compared as a Socratic argument, Brandolini breaks from the Italian humanist tradition of employing Ciceronian dialogues to examine political theory. Brandolini's treatise may be the only example of the use of Socratic dialogue by an Italian Renaissance humanist.

Brandolini applies both chronological and thematic divisions in his treatise. The action of the dialogue extends over three days within the Kingdom of Hungary. Each day is captured in a book, and on each day the debaters examine a different point of comparison between kingdoms and republics.

=== Book I ===
Book I addresses how kingdoms and republics promote liberty. However, Brandolini begins Book I with a lengthy aside on the virtues most valuable to rulers of political regimes.

Three days before Lent, Prince János states to his father that his classical studies have led him to suppose that modern rulers are more decadent than their ancient counterparts. Matthias Corvinus informs his son János that rulers both ancient and modern must adopt two domestic and two external virtues to maintain their political regimes. The two domestic virtues are justice and temperance. The two external virtues are martial valor and a desire for glory. Matthias presents prudence, or wisdom, as a fifth virtue so integral to political life that "it can never be absent." Matthias then distinguishes between the desire for glory, which cultivates the other virtues, and the desire for empire, which is marked by a love of money and luxuries.

Matthias' claim prompts János to ask whether republics or kingdoms are more suited to promoting liberty, justice, and good governance. János then beckons Domenico Giugni, a merchant in Matthias' entourage with political and socioeconomic ties to the Republic of Florence, to join the conversation. Domencio reluctantly joins, opining that he has always reckoned republics preferable to kingdoms. Domenico claims that "there is complete liberty in a republic and none in a kingdom," that the Florentine Republic is more just than the Kingdom of Hungary, and that "all things are governed better and with greater stability by many persons than by one."

Domenico claims that liberty is the power to do whatever one wishes in everyday life. He separates liberty from license. While answering Matthias' probing questions, Domenico states that Florentine liberty is grounded on the ability to impose taxes without free from the influence of foreign powers.

Mathtias denies that the right to tax is the foundation of liberty, either in republics or kingdoms. Liberty, Matthias claims, resides in the security of a regime's people and the integrity of the regime's rulers. Domenico gradually admits that Florentine politics, where officials are chosen by lot, are less stable and more open to corruption than Hungarian politics. He later admits that, in civil cases between Florentines, the Republic entrusts foreigners to judge the cases to ensure impartiality. Florence is in fact subject to foreign nations to ensure domestic tranquility. Book I ends with Prince János' summation that the Florentine Republic "is not free but is in servitude to itself," and that "no one ever can enjoy solid peace and tranquility so long as he wants to be a good citizen."

=== Book II ===
Book II addresses how kingdoms and republics promote justice.

Matthias states that a regime's laws are the clearest indication of whether a regime is promoting justice or injustice. He proposes that kingdoms are more just than republics as the Athenians, Romans, and Hebrews received their legal systems from a single lawgiver. Consensus, a characteristic of republics, is not conductive to prudent laws or promoting justice within a regime. Domenico admits that Florence's laws were instituted by individual citizens, leading Matthias to conclude that legislation is the responsibility of kings.

Unwilling to concede that kingdoms are more adept at promoting justice, Domenico claims it to be better to live under the rule of law than live under the rule of a king. A king can set aside laws and make rulings which better preserve his self-interest. Law is free of emotion and self-interest. It is thus better able to issue impartial rulings which cohere with the virtue of justice.

Matthias agrees that the rule of law is impartial. However, as law as it exists in Florence and Hungary were made by men, they are imperfect vessels for preserving justice. Laws in modern republics and kingdoms are unable to distinguish the subtle gradations between good and evil. Kingdoms are best able to fix legal errors in judgement, as monarchs are educated to address "things which the laws cannot sufficiently foresee." Matthias brushes aside Domenico's objection that kings may be corrupt themselves, stating that if one ruler may be corrupt than the rule of many will magnify corruption to an unacceptable degree. The king, Matthias insists, is the arm of government most likely to act virtuously within a political regime.

Domenico switches tactics, stating that an important component of justice is free trade between political regimes. Kingdoms may be more effective at promoting justice in regard to domestic affairs, but they lag behind republics in preserving justice between nations. Matthias accuses Domenico of comparing Florence to Hungary rather than comparing republics to kingdoms. Some kingdoms, such as Spain, conduct extensive commercial relations while the Republic of Siena and Republic of Lucca do not.

Matthias discourages extensive commercial ties between regimes, as such ties corrupt the morals of the young and incentivize citizens and subjects to reject virtuous behavior. He claims that commerce caused the destruction of the Athenian democracy and the Roman Republic, but admits that trade divorced from greed is admirable and healthy for political regimes. Matthias also advocates that rulers allow subjects and citizens to travel abroad to pursue education.

Matthias condemns modern republics like Florence that utilize commercial relations to divide citizens by economic status, and for allowing this division to stymie the equal implementation of the laws. Domenco refuses to concede that republics are more unjust than kingdoms but is so discouraged that he asks to resume the debate the following day.

=== Book III ===
Book III addresses how kingdoms and republics promote effective government. Domenico stresses that this is a key point in the debate.

Domenico states that, since all modern kings are men, they must often rest and are thus not always available to administer government functions. Matthias' response is multifaceted. First, he claims that all human beings want to be commanded by observably superior rulers. Matthias then claims that, even if a king is unable to actively administer all portions of a government, his subordinates will administer the government on his behalf out of fear and love. Finally, Matthias reminds Domenico that the European family structure is hierarchical: one man is the head of household, which allows the household to be managed efficiently.

Domenico disagrees with Matthias' premise. Administering a government is far more complex than managing a household. As a political regime consists of many households, many people must be responsible for managing the government. Matthias responds by framing good governance as the domain or reason and mental fortitude rather than physical strength. He reminds Domenico that reason is more easily found in one ruler than many rulers.

Domenico states that reason is rare even among individuals. Republics allow many men to administer government affairs in order to check passionate outbursts from and emotional detonations within any single government official. Republican government governs more safely and stably than monarchical government.

Matthias responds by denouncing republican government for promoting factionalism. Factions within republican government emerge because republics cultivate them in an effort to promote good governance. History demonstrates that factions prevent good government rather than preserving it, particularly in republics like Florence. Matthias believes kingdoms, where one man surpasses all others in virtue and ambition, provide a more likely avenue for promoting good governance than republics. Republics multiply the passions rather than promote the rule of reason.

Matthias then reminds Dominicio that the Christian religion, administered by a single omniscient and omnipotent God, is the model all political regimes should strive to emulate. The relative few unstable republics that currently exist, compared with strong monarchies like the Kingdoms of Hungary, Spain, and France, should persuade Domenico that kingdoms are both divinely mandated and the natural state of government. The debate ends with János convinced and Domenico acknowledging the superiority of kingdoms to republics.

== Modern Analysis ==
Apart from some late-19th century studies in Hungarian, a 1995 Italian translation, a single English translation published in 2009, and a smattering of recent reviews of that translation, modern scholarship has largely overlooked Republics and Kingdoms Compared as a work deserving of dedicated study.

Professor Allison K. Frazier of the University of Texas at Austin connects Brandolini's decision to frame his work as a Socratic dialogue with the Latin translations of Plato's Statesmen and Laws by Marsilio Ficino which had been recently published and had begun circulating within the Hungarian court. Frazier also remarks on the curious circumstances that led Brandolini, a Florentine humanist, to support monarchy so prominently in his treatise.

Critic Raffaele Florio proposes that Brandolini's Republics and Kingdoms Compared be read as a companion to Machiavelli's Discourse on Livy and The Prince. He also recognizes Brandolini's treatise as a unique snapshot "of the late fifteenth-century Florentine Zeitgeist, and suggests that lecturers and professors use it to freshen up the traditional political theorist lineup of Aristotle, Thomas Hobbes, John Locke, and Jean-Jacques Rousseau.

Florio, along with Brandolini's English translator James Hankins, remark that Brandolini's theoretical assessment of government structure sets Republics and Kingdoms Compared apart from treatises written by other early Rennaissance humanists.

Translator, lawyer, and literary critic George J. Thomas also compares Brandolini with Niccolò Machiavelli. Writing under the pseudonym Quintus Curtius, Thomas proposes that, like Machiavelli, "Brandolini looked hopefully to a strong, centralized government as an antidote to the fratricidal wars of the Italian micro-republics." Thomas also acknowledges that, in order to function well, republics and democracies must be composed of educated and engaged citizens. Monarchies can survive without informed and energetic subjects. He supposes like Brandolini that citizens in republican and democratic governments promote monarchical forms of government by prioritizing private forms of pleasure over civic participation.

== Translations ==
Brandolini, Aurelio Lippo (2009). Republics and Kingdoms Compared. Translated by James Hankins. Harvard University Press. ISBN 9780674033986.
