= Union Académique Internationale =

Federation of national and international academies

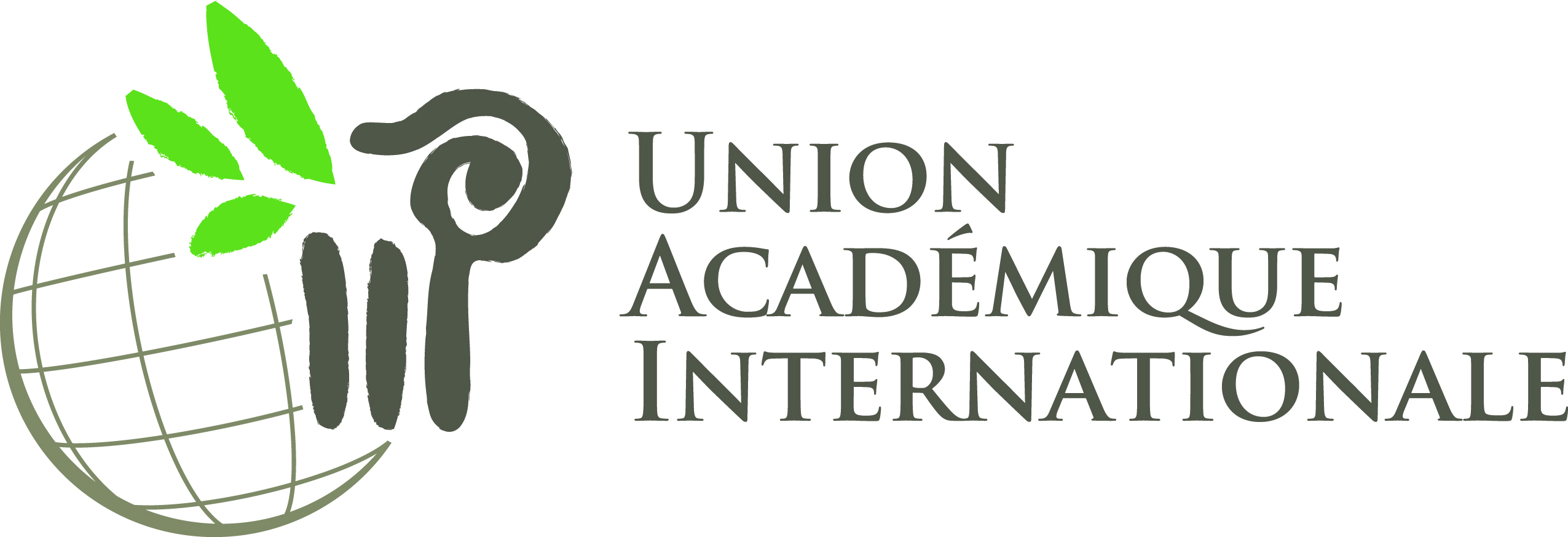
Union académique internationale

The Union Académique Internationale (UAI)—in English, International Union of Academies—is a federation of many national academies and international academies from more than 60 countries all over the world which works in the field of Humanities and Social Sciences.

The Union wants to create an international collaboration between its Member Academies, offering to them a chance to meet and work together on projects of medium and long term and enabling them to participating to the great national and international movement of scientific research. Its purpose is to encourage cooperation in the advancement of studies through collaborative research and joint publications in those branches of humanities and social sciences promoted by the Academies and Institutions represented in the UAI: philology, archaeology, history, moral sciences and political sciences. The UAI works to promote the advancement of knowledge and scientific exchanges and to support initiatives of all its academies.

French and English are the official languages of the union.

== History ==
=== Creation ===
The UAI was founded in 1919 on the initiative of the Académie des Inscriptions et Belles-Lettres. After four years of war, the world was longing for peace and understanding between nations. With this in mind, international cooperation was to be promoted in all areas and at all levels, including those of intellectual and scientific work. At a meeting held in Paris in May 1919, the draft statutes were prepared. They were revised and adopted at a second meeting held again in Paris from 15 to 18 October 1919. The proposed project envisaged international academic cooperation in the area of the humanities. During these assemblies, representatives of National Academies from eleven countries adhered to the Union (Belgium, Denmark, France, Great Britain, Greece, Italy, Japan, the Netherlands, Poland and Russia, the United States) and National Academies of three other countries gave their agreement without being represented (Spain, Norway and Romania). Later in that year, Yugoslavia and Portugal adhered to the Union. Currently, the UAI has members from more than 60 countries all over the world.

=== First Assembly in Brussels ===
The first general assembly was held in Brussels from 26 to 28 May 1920 where the Belgian historian Henri Pirenne was elected the first president. The administrative seat of the Union was established in the Palace of Academies in Brussels. The Académie royale des sciences, des lettres et des beaux-arts de Belgique is in charge of the secretariat of the UAI and its Permanent Secretary is ex officio the General Secretary.

During this first session, three projects (in French, entreprises) were submitted: the Corpus vasorum antiquorum, the Alchemical Manuscripts, and publication of the Works of Grotius. These projects of a real international character have since earned the thanks of scholars by the meticulous precision with which they have been executed. Up to the Second World War one can observe a slow development: 13 projects were adopted. Currently, the UAI has 81 projects completed or in progress. The UAI can only realize its projects through the international cooperation of its Member Academies.

=== The following years ===
Between 1937 and 1947, no General Assemblies were held because of the world catastrophe and all its consequences. In 1949, the UAI takes pride in having assisted in the foundation of the International Council for Philosophy and Humanistic Studies (ICPHS)—in French: Conseil International de la Philosophie et des Sciences Humaines (CIPSH). In 1964, the UAI received the Erasmus Prize for its success in promoting international collaboration. In 1969, the 50th anniversary of the UAI was celebrated: a ceremony was held under the cupola of the prestigious Institut de France in Paris. In 1976, the UAI included 31 member countries and the number of its projects had risen to 32. In 1995, the 75th anniversary of the UAI was celebrated in Prague.

The 100th anniversary was celebrated at the Institut de France in Paris in 2019.

== Missions and objectives ==
The missions of the Union Académique Internationale are:

1. to encourage cooperation between national Academies (and comparable institutions) whose activities are mainly or partly concerned with the field of human and social sciences. This cooperation is achieved by leading projects of high scholarly and intellectual standard and by coordinating interdisciplinary and joint activities, conceived in full partnership, over the long and medium-term. These should result in the production of fundamental reference tools that enhance the knowledge and advance fundamental research, for the benefit of both the people involved in the research (scholars, experts, researchers,...) and the general public;
2. to preserve and promote of the human and social sciences, at the level of both national and international academies;
3. to develop a solid support for every national academy and its members, provided people are convinced of the rightfulness and the advantages of this solidarity and international cooperation.

To achieve its mission, the UAI will work, in the years to come:

1. to increase inter-academy cooperation by multiplying the projects which it will share or initiate;
2. to encourage all the national organisations that are active in the domain of human and social sciences, to join the uai by developing or cooperating on scholarly projects of a high standard recognised at the international level;
3. toat the international level to represent jointly and in a proactive way, directly or indirectly (in partnership with supranational and or non governmental organisations) both the academies themselves and their fundamental principle of excellence.

To fulfil its mission and to carry out its vision, the UAI will have the following objectives:

1. to strengthen the progress and the implementation of current projects and to increase their relevance in a positive and critical way; to undertake syntheses, made available to the Member Academies;
2. to set up a strategic plan that will consider the dissemination of information to be essential in the new information age, a plan that will facilitate the sharing of knowledge and the spread of information, and that will be updated through periodic assessments;
3. to update the functioning of its governance and management bodies and to develop a positive image by a critical reassessment of its communication tools;
4. to increase its financial means and the funds made available for projects through a systematic search for partnership with international public or private foundations;
5. to encourage member academies to participate more actively in current projects and to set up new interdisciplinary and internationally oriented projects;
6. to strengthen its presence and its participation in international organizations by increasing its visibility in these venues, utilizing its accumulated knowledge and that of its members, and emphasizing its links with the global communications set up by them.

== Management ==
=== The Board ===
The Board (in French, le Bureau) is responsible for organizing the General Assembly and presides over its deliberations; it controls the general administration and the progress of works. It is entitled to take urgent measures in the interval between General Assemblies and, if necessary, to convene an Extraordinary General Assembly. The Board has all the powers of management and administration that are necessary or appropriate to carry out the purposes of the association, except those specifically reserved to the General Assembly.

It is composed of a President, two Vice-Presidents and six members, with Honorary Presidents in a consultative role. All are elected for a term of three years. The Secretary General is also a member of the Board.

=== General Assembly ===
Each year, a representative (called "delegate") from every member academy attends a General Assembly to discuss and to cooperate in meetings. The General Assembly is always held at the seat of one of the UAI's Member Academies and each year at a different location: one year in Brussels, one year somewhere else in Europe, one year somewhere outside Europe.

=== General Secretariat ===
The Secretary General attends to the coordination of the activities of the UAI, follows the progress of the various projects and supports the Bureau in its handling of the correspondence and agenda of the UAI and in the organization of annual sessions. Since its foundation the UAI has its seat in the Palace of Academies in Brussels. The Académie royale des sciences, des lettres et des beaux-arts de Belgique is in charge of the secretariat of the UAI and its Permanent Secretary is the ex officio General Secretary.

== Projects ==
Since 1919, the number of projects sponsored, supported or supervised by the UAI has steadily increased: from the first three projects adopted in 1919, to 81 projects completed or in progress today.

An initiative for a new project can only be taken by a Member Academy of the UAI (through its delegate mandated for this purpose) or by the Board of the UAI itself. The proposal must contain a precise definition of its subject, an explanatory memorandum, a work plan, a budget and a statement of the financial responsibility for its execution. The project must set and maintain high standards of scholarship, as well as possessing international character and interest.

=== List of projects ===
Number	Project name	Website
1	Corpus Vasorum Antiquorum (CVA)	http://www.cvaonline.org/
2	Alchimic Texts	-
3	Works of Grotius	-
4	Customary law in Indonesia	-
5	Dictionary of Medieval Latin	-
6a	Tabula Imperii Romani (TIR)	-
6b	Forma Orbis Romani (FOR)	-
7	Unpublished Historical Documents concerning Japan	-
8	Scholarly editions and editing	-
9/1	Plato Latinus (Corpus Philosophorum Medii Aevi)	-
9/2a	Aristoteles Latinus (Corpus Philosophorum Medii Aevi)	-
9/2b	Aristoteles Semitico-Latinus (Corpus Philosophorum Medii Aevi)	-
9/3	Avicenna Latinus (Corpus Philosophorum Medii Aevi)	-
9/4	Averrois Opera (Corpus Philosophorum Medii Aevi)	-
9/5	Arnau de Villanova (Corpus Philosophorum Medii Aevi)	-
9/6	Philosophorum Medii Aevi Opera Selecta (Corpus Philosophorum Medii Aevi)	-
9/7a	Philosophi Byzantini (Corpus Philosophorum Medii Aevi)	-
9/7b	Commentaria in Aristotelem Byzantina (Corpus Philosophorum Medii Aevi)	-
10a	Codices Latini Antiquiores (CLA)	-
10b	Chartae Latinae Antiquiores (ChLA)	-
11a	Concordances and indexes of the Islamic tradition	-
11b	Encyclopaedia of Islam	-
12a	Monumenta Musicae Byzantinae	-
12b	Corpus Scriptorum de re Musica	-
13	Dictionary of Terminology of International Law	-
14	Catalogus Translationum et Commentariorum	http://www.catalogustranslationum.org/
15	Sumerian and Assyrian Dictionaries	-
16	Corpus Vitrearum	-
17	International Bibliography of Art of the Far East	-
18	Pali Dictionary	-
19	Corpus of the Troubadours	-
20	Corpus Antiquitatum Americanensium	-
21	Collected Works of Erasmus	-
22	Fontes Historiae Africanae (FHA)	-
23	Dictionaries	-
24	Sources for Philosophy of Art (Corpus Theoriae Artis)	-
25	History and Philology of Pre-Islamic Iran and Central Asia	-
26	Sylloge Nummorum Graecorum (SNG)	-
27	Corpus Inscriptionum Iranicarum (CII)	-
28/a	Lexicon Iconographicum Mythologiae Classicae (LIMC)	-
28/b	Thesaurus Cultus et Rituum Antiquorum (ThesCRA)	-
29	Polyglot Lexicon of Palaeography and Polyglot Lexicon of Codicology	-
30	Constitutional corpus	-
31	Atlas Linguarum Europae (ALE)	-
32	Bibliographies of the History of Art	-
33	Critical Inventory of Râmâyana	-
34	Complete Works of Voltaire	-
35	Index of Jewish Art	-
36a	Language Atlas of the Pacific Area (LAPA)	-
36b	Language Atlas of China	-
36c	Atlas of the languages of Korea	-
37	Corpus of Coptic Literary Manuscripts	-
38	New Nautical Glossary (JAL)	-
39	Langues of Intercultural Communication in the Pacific area	-
40a	Corpus of Byzantine Monumental Paintings	-
40b	Corpus of Mexican Mural Paintings in America	-
41	Corpus of Byzantine Astronomers	-
42	Corpus of Greek and Latin philosophical papyri	-
43	Corpus Iuris Sanscriticum	-
44	Corpus of Phoenician and Punic Antiquities	-
45	New Complete Collection of Fabliaux (NRCF)	-
46	Corpus Christianorum, Series Apocryphorum	-
47	Corpus Iuris Islamici (Encyclopedia of Islamic Law)	-
48	Atlas of the Greek and Roman World	-
49	Greek and Latin inscriptions (Corpora, Supplementum Epigraphicum Graecum and Cor	-
50	Sanskrit Dictionary of the Buddhist Texts from the Turfan finds	-
51	Monumenta palaeographica medii aevi	-
52	Clavis Monumentorum Litterarum Bohemiae (CMLB)	-
53	Catalogue of Oriental Manuscripts Collections	-
54	Fuentes para la Historia del Teatro en Espana	-
55	ve Sources for the History of the River Plate and Chile	-
56	Sciences humaines en Europe centrale et orientale	-
57	Moravia Magna	-
58	Encyclopædia Iranica	-
59	Corpus Fontium Manichaeorum	-
60	Norse-Icelandic Skaldik Poetry of the Scandinavian Middle Ages	-
61	Scytho-Sarmatian World and Greco-Roman Civilization	-
62	Compendium Auctorum Latinorum Medii Aevi	-
63	Spanish Dictionary of International Literary Terms	-
64	Middle Persian Dictionary	-
65	Corpus Epistolarum Ioannis Dantisci	-
66	Comparative History of Literatures in European Languages	-
67	China and the Mediterranean World: Archaeological and Written Sources	-
68	Encyclopaedia of Indian Poetics	-
69	Hobogirin	-
70	Iusti Lipsi Epistolae	-
71	Corpus Humanisticarum Praefationum	-
72	Papyrus-Archives. Edition and Studies	-
73	Corpus Rubenianum Ludwig Burchard	-
74	The Salerne School of Medicine	-
75	Epistolae Pontificum Romanorum	-
76	Greek-Old Church Slavonic Lexicon-Index	-
77	Greek and Latin Inscriptions	-
78	Supplementum Epigraphicum Graecum (SEG)	-
79	Codices Graeci Antiquiores	-
80	Corpus Limitis Imperii Romani	-
81	Philologia Coranica	-
