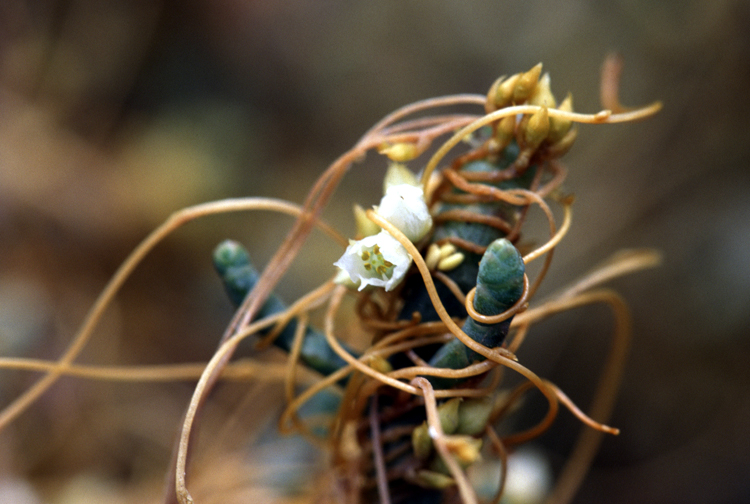
- var. pacifica

Scientific classification
- Kingdom: Plantae
- Clade: Tracheophytes
- Clade: Angiosperms
- Clade: Eudicots
- Clade: Asterids
- Order: Solanales
- Family: Convolvulaceae
- Genus: Cuscuta
- Species: C. pacifica

Binomial name
- Cuscuta pacifica Costea & M.A.R.Wright

= Cuscuta pacifica =

Species of flowering plant

Cuscuta pacifica is a species of dodder. Its common name is goldenthread.

== Distribution ==
The plant is native to the coast of western North America from British Columbia to Baja California. It is a halophyte, living in coastal salt marsh habitats, such as the San Francisco Bay.

== Description ==
Cuscuta pacifica is a slender annual vine with yellowish thread-like stems that wrap tightly around other plants. The leaves are reduced to tiny scales, and it possesses no roots because it is a parasitic plant, like all Cuscuta, and taps nutrients from host plants with its haustoria.

The salt marsh dodder produces flowers with bell-shaped, white glandular corollas with five-pointed triangular lobes. It tends to parasitize Salicornia, but also may be found on other species such as Jaumea carnosa and Grindelia stricta.

Recently, it has become clear that waterfowl might be involved in the dispersal of the species' seeds, as has been confirmed for C. campestris.

=== Varieties ===
The species includes two varieties:

- Cuscuta pacifica var. pacifica is significantly more common, occurring throughout the species range.
- Cuscuta pacifica var. papillata is a very rare endemic of sand-dune habitats in Mendocino County.

Previous treatments included this species as two varieties of a more broadly defined Cuscuta salina, but they were recently recognized to be a distinct species with clear habitat and host affinities and reproductively isolated from Cuscuta salina var. salina.
