= The Golden Thread: A History of the Western Tradition =

2025 book series

- Author: Allen C. Guelzo and James Hankins
- Publisher: Encounter Books
- Published: 2025

The Golden Thread: A History of the Western Tradition is a two-part book series on the history of Western civilization by Allen C. Guelzo and James Hankins.

== General references ==
- Anderson, Brian C. (October 10, 2025). "The West's Civilizational Inheritance". City Journal.
- Goldberg, Jonah (September 25, 2025). "Barbarians at the Gate". The Dispatch.
- Grove, John G. (September 23, 2025). "Ho, Hey! Western Civ Is Here to Stay – Law & Liberty - James Hankins". Law & Liberty.
- Gurdon, Meghan Cox (August 15, 2025). "'The Golden Thread' Review: A Treasure-House of Culture". The Wall Street Journal.
- Kurtz, Stanley (November 3, 2025). "We Need a New Renaissance". National Review.
