= Maffeo Vegio =

Italian poet (1407–1458)

Maffeo Vegio (Latin: Maphaeus Vegius; 1407–1458) was an Italian poet who wrote in Latin; he is regarded by many as the finest Latin poet of the fifteenth century.

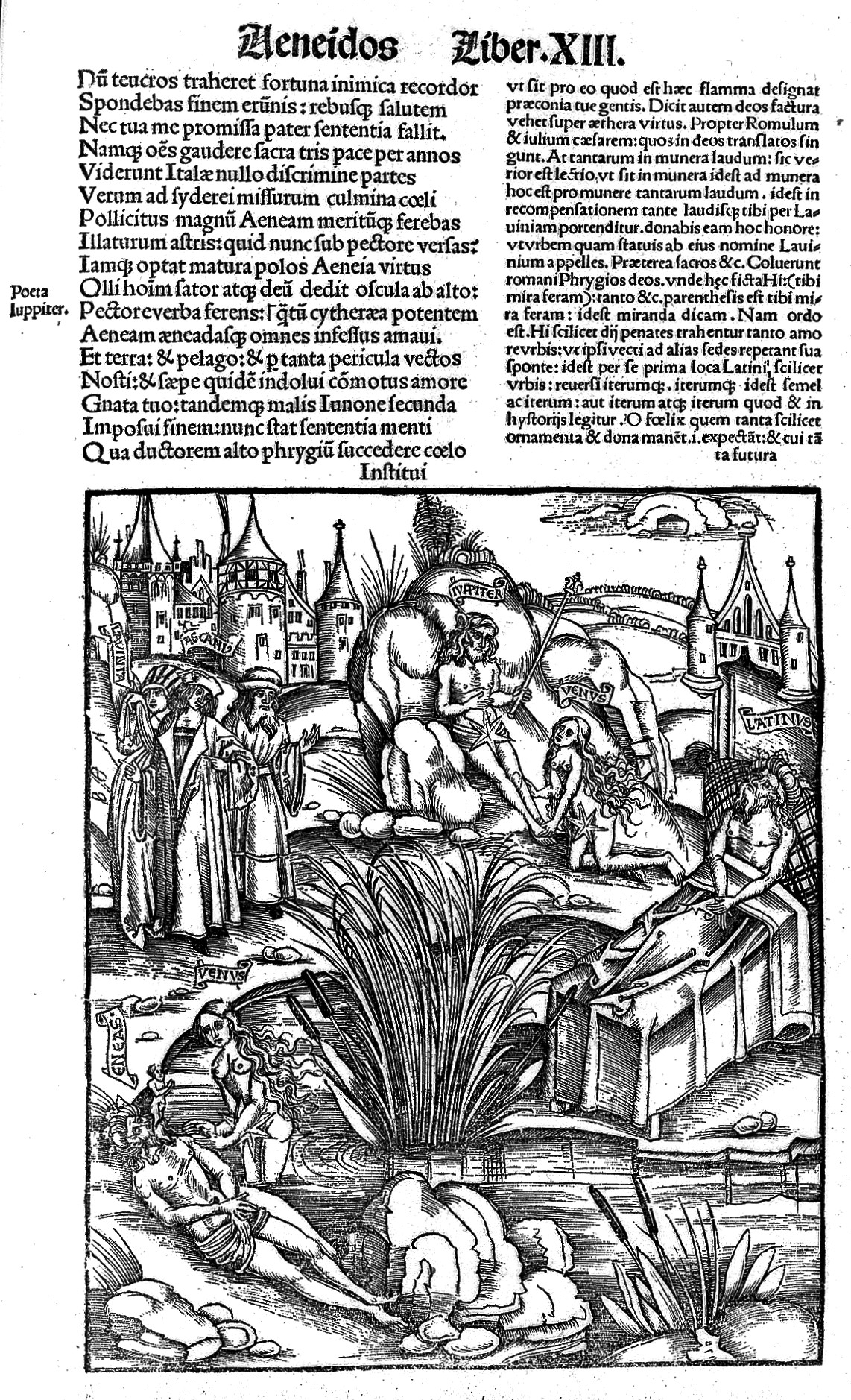
Apotheosis of Aeneas

Born near Lodi, he studied at the University of Pavia, and went on to write some fifty works of both prose and poetry.

His greatest reputation came as the writer of brief epics, the most famous of which was his continuation of Virgil's Aeneid, known variously as the Supplementum (Supplement) or Aeneidos Liber XIII (Book 13 of the Aeneid). Completed in 1428, this 600-line poem starts immediately after the end of Virgil's epic, and describes Aeneas's marriage to Lavinia and his eventual deification. Its combination of classical learning and piety made it very popular in its day; it was often included in editions of the Aeneid in the fifteenth and sixteenth centuries. An electronic text can be found at the Latin Library.

Vegio also wrote an epic, Astyanax (1430), on the death of the son of Hector, prince of Troy, and a four-book epic, Vellus Aureum (the Golden Fleece) (1431). During 1436–37 he completed his epic on the life of the Christian Saint Anthony, the Antoniad. Michael C. J. Putnam edited and translated Vegio's Short Epics for the I Tatti Renaissance Library (Harvard University Press).

Vegio flattered his way into the papal court, and was made canon of St. Peter's Basilica in 1443; it was an office he held until his death in 1458.

Some of Vegio's poems were later set as motets by renaissance composers – an example being Huc me sidereo, set by Josquin, Jacobus Vaet, Orlando Di Lasso and the first motet of Adrian Willaert's 1559 Musica Nova collection.

== Works ==
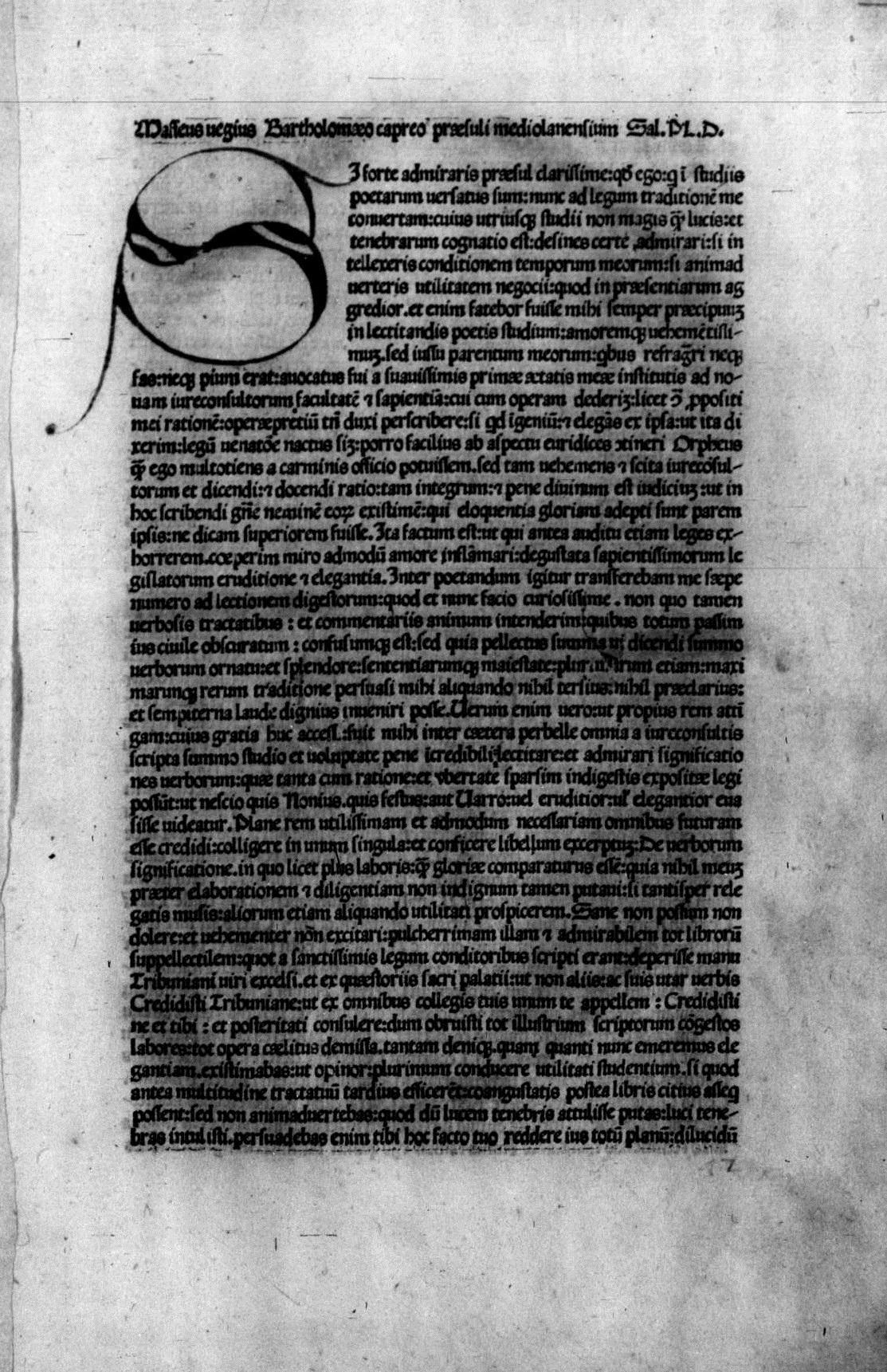
Vocabula ex iure civili excerpta, 1477

(partial list)

Poems

- Poemata et epigrammata, 1422
- Rusticalia
- De morte Astyanactis, 1430
- Velleris aurei libri quattuor, 1431

Religious texts

- Antoniados sive de vita et laudibus sancti Antonii, 1436–1437
- De perseverantia religionis
- De quattuor hominis novissimis, morte, judicio, inferno et paradiso meditationes
- Vita sancti Bernardi Senensis
- Sanctae Monicae translationis ordo. Item de sanctae Monicae vita et ejus officium proprium

Works about ethics

- Disceptatio inter solem, terram, et aurum.
- Dialogus Veritatis et Philalethis.
- Palinurus sive de felicitate et miseria, 1445.

Historical works

- De rebus antiquis memorabilibus Basilicae sancti Petri Romae, 1455–1457.

Works about law

- Vocabula ex iure civili excerpta (in Latin). Vicenza: Filippo Albino. 1477.
