= Catalogus Translationum et Commentariorum =

- Available in: English
- Website: catalogustranslationum.org
- Commercial: No — open access
- Content license: CC-BY-NC-ND and CC-BY-NC-SA

Founded in 1945, with its first volume published in 1960, the Catalogus Translationum et Commentariorum is a scholarly journal documenting the work of international scholars interested in classical tradition during the Middle Ages and Renaissance.

Each article treats a separate classical author, beginning with a detailed essay on the author's reception from antiquity to 1600. This is followed by a comprehensive list both of printed and manuscript commentaries in Latin on the author and, in the case of ancient Greek authors, a list of Latin translations as well.

In 2015, the Catalogus Translationum et Commentariorum moved to online open access for previous editions while continuing to produce the current volume in print for sale through the Pontifical Institute of Mediaeval Studies.

== Purpose ==
The Catalogus Translationum et Commentariorum is intended to illustrate the transmission of the ideas, and the influence, of ancient Greek and Latin authors (up to 600 AD) during the Middle Ages and the Renaissance (up to 1600 AD).

It does so by a complete listing of all traceable Latin translations of these authors and of commentaries. For each translation or commentary, the Catalogus provides a brief introductory statement on the date and circumstances of the work; each translation or commentary is described and identified by Incipit and Explicit, and there is a list of all known manuscripts and printed editions, with locations for both. As part of its movement online, the Catalogus has been able to provide these listings as searchable indices combining work from all volumes into four databases: Index of Articles, Index of Manuscripts, Index of Translators and Commentators, and an Index of Ancient Authors.

For each translator or commentator, there is a brief bio-bibliography. Finally each article on a classical author begins with a Fortuna outlining the author's history during the Middle Ages and the Renaissance.

In terms of the purpose of the Catalogus, the list of Latin translations helps to establish the facts about the gradual reception of ancient Greek material in the West up to 1600 AD. These Latin translations from the Greek had a much wider circulation, even during the Renaissance, than either the Greek originals or the vernacular translations, which were in fact usually based upon one of the Latin versions rather than upon the original Greek text. Hence a study of the fortunes and influence of any Greek author in the West must begin with an investigation of the existence and relative merit of the Latin translations of his works.

The list of Latin commentaries serve a similar purpose, especially for the fortunes and influence of the ancient Latin authors. The commentaries represent a neglected branch of literature, and they provide evidence for the use made of authors commented on. The commentaries also illustrate the mental slant and characteristic interests of the commentator and of his period; they help us to understand the many and often diverse 'perceptions' of an ancient author.

Finally, the study of the commentaries throws light upon the curricula of schools and universities for whose use they were often composed.

While the series intends to include all ancient authors, a "few areas in which the amount of material is overwhelming are left out – commentaries on Aristotle; on medical, legal, and canonistic works; on the Bible; and on medieval Latin authors–as are scattered, anonymous glosses and miscellaneous observations on various ancient writers."

== History ==
The original plans for the Catalogus were developed during 1945–46 under the aegis of the American Council of Learned Societies. Its organizational form was established in 1946 with an editorial board, an executive committee, and an International Committee. In 1965 the organization formed itself into The Mediaeval and Renaissance Latin Translations and Commentaries Association. The project was adopted by the Union Académique Internationale on the initiative of the Medieval Academy of America in 1951.

The general aims of the Catalogus Translationum et Commentariorum, which have been followed to this date, are set out in the 1958 Preface to Volume I, by its founder and first Executive Editor Paul Oskar Kristeller of Columbia University.

The current editor is Greti Dinkova-Bruun of the Pontifical Institute of Mediaeval Studies.
