= Giannozzo Manetti =

Italian politician and diplomat (1396–1459)

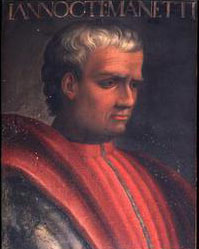
Portrait of Giannozzo Manetti

Giannozzo Manetti (1396–1459) was an Italian politician and diplomat from Florence, who was also a humanist scholar of the early Italian Renaissance and a strongly anti-Jewish polemicist and Christian apologist.

Manetti was the son of a wealthy merchant. His public career began in 1428. He served in municipal government as a member of the advisory council, as an ambassador, and in various gubernatorial positions in the city. Manetti was an eyewitness of the dedication of the Santa Maria del Fiore cathedral on 25 March 1436, of which he left a record, titled the Oratio de Secularibus et Pontificalibus Pompis in Consecratione Basilicae Florentinae. His views on Florentine relations with Venice proved unpopular among the ruling class, and he went into voluntary exile, spending the last years of his life in Naples.

== Author and translator ==
Manetti was a Latinist and a translator of Greek. He also studied Hebrew so that he could read the Hebrew Bible and the rabbinic commentaries, not to seek tolerance but to attack Jews with their own sources. At the papal court of Nicholas V and then at the court of Alfonso of Aragon in Naples, Manetti made new Latin translations of the Psalter from Hebrew, of the New Testament from Greek, and of Aristotle's moral works. His New Testament, undertaken with the encouragement of Nicholas V, was the first Latin translation of the New Testament since Jerome's Vulgate, half a century before the Latin version that Erasmus printed beside the Greek text in his Novum Instrumentum (1516). It circulated only in manuscript (Vatican Library, Pal. lat. 45 and Urb. lat. 6) until Annet den Haan's critical edition of 2016. Only the Psalter circulated in his lifetime, and he defended it in his Apologeticus.

Like other humanists of his generation, Manetti pursued Ciceronian ideals in rhetoric and ethics. He is now remembered principally as the author of De dignitate et excellentia hominis libri IV ("On the Dignity and Excellence of Man in Four Books"), written in 1452 at the request of King Alfonso. His History of Pistoia (Historia Pistoriensis), composed while he was Captain of Pistoia (1446–47), drew on two works by his mentor Leonardo Bruni, the History of the Florentine People and De origine Mantuae. He also translated Aristotle's ethical works and wrote biographies of Dante Alighieri, Giovanni Boccaccio, Francesco Petrarca, Seneca, Socrates and Pope Nicholas V.

Manetti's humanist contemporaries included his mentor Bruni, his Greek teacher Ambrogio Traversari, and his friend and former teacher Francesco Filelfo, as well as Carlo Marsuppini, Poggio Bracciolini, Palla Strozzi, and Lorenzo Valla.

After his death, his library passed to his son Agnolo. Around 1550, what remained was sold to the German collector Ulrich Fugger, and it went with the Bibliotheca Palatina from Heidelberg to the Vatican Library in 1623, where it is now among the Palatini manuscripts.

== List of works ==
- Apologeticus, as A Translator's Defense, ed. Myron McShane, trans. Mark Young, I Tatti Renaissance Library 71, Cambridge, Mass., Harvard University Press, 2016. [A defense of his translation of the Psalms from the Hebrew, and a treatise on translation]. ISBN 978-0674088658.
- Biographical Writings, ed. Stefano U. Baldassarri and Rolf Bagemihl, I Tatti Renaissance Library, Cambridge, Mass., Harvard University Press, 2003. ISBN 978-0674011342.
- De dignitate et excellentia hominis, ed. Elizabeth R. Leonard, Padua, Editrice Antenore, 1974. ISBN 978-8884551436.
- De terremotu, ed. Daniela Pagliara, Florence, SISMEL-Edizioni del Galluzzo, 2012. ISBN 978-88-8450-492-0.
- De vita ac gestis Nicolai quinti summi pontificis, ed. Anna Modigliani, Fonti per la storia d'Italia, Rome, Istituto storico italiano per il Medio Evo, 2005. ISBN 8889190108.
- Historia Pistoriensis, critical edition by Stefano Ugo Baldassarri and Benedetta Aldi, historical commentary by William J. Connell, Edizione Nazionale dei Testi della Storiografia Umanistica, Florence, SISMEL-Edizioni del Galluzzo, 2011. ISBN 978-8884504425.
- On the Dignity of Man, in Two Views of Man: Pope Innocent III - On the Misery of Man; Giannozzo Manetti - On the Dignity of Man, ed. and trans. Bernard Murchland, New York, Ungar, [1966].
- Un episodio del proto-humanismo español: tres opúsculos de Nuño de Guzmán y Giannozzo Manetti, ed. Jeremy N. H. Lawrence, Salamanca, Biblioteca española del Siglo XV-Diputaciòn de Salamanca, 1989.
- Vita Socratis et Senecae, ed. Alfonso De Petris, Florence: Leo S. Olschki, 1979.
- On Human Worth and Excellence, edited by Brian P. Copenhaver, Harvard University Press, 2018 (The I Tatti Renaissance Library, 85).

== Sources ==
- Baldassarri, Stefano Ugo (2008). Dignitas et excellentia hominis : atti del Convegno internazionale di studi su Giannozzo Manetti : Georgetown University-Kent State University, Fiesole-Firenze, 18-20 giugno 2007, Florence: Le Lettere. ISBN 8860871220.
- Connell, William J. (2002). "Il cittadino umanista come ufficiale nel territorio : una rilettura di Giannozzo Manetti," in Andrea Zorzi and William J. Connell, eds., Lo stato territoriale fiorentino (secoli XIV-XV) : ricerche, linguaggi, confronti : atti del seminario internazionale di studi, San Miniato, 7-8 giugno 1996, Pisa: Pacini, pp. 359–383.
- Eck, Caroline (1998). "Giannozzo Manetti on Architecture: The Oratio de Secularibus et Pontificalibus Pompis in Consecratione Basilicae Florentinae of 1436". Renaissance Studies, 12:4, pp. 449–475.
- Grout, Donald Jay, and Palisca, Claude V. (2001). A History of Western Music, 6th ed. New York: W. W. Norton & Co. ISBN 0-393-97527-4.
- Smith, Christine and Joseph F. O'Connor (2006). Building the kingdom : Giannozzo Manetti on the material and spiritual edifice, Tempe: ACMRS. ISBN 9782503525815.
