= Paul Oskar Kristeller =

German historian (1905-1999)

- Born: May 22, 1905; Berlin, German Empire
- Died: June 7, 1999 (aged 94); New York City, U.S.
- Occupations: Historian, educator
- Awards: Guggenheim Fellowship; MacArthur Fellowship; Haskins Medal

Academic background
- Education: University of Heidelberg
- Doctoral advisor: Ernst Hoffmann

Academic work
- Discipline: Historian
- Sub-discipline: Renaissance humanism
- Institutions: Scuola Normale Superiore (1933-1939); Yale University (1939); Columbia University (until 1973)
- Notable students: A. James Gregor; Irving Louis Horowitz; Richard Popkin

Paul Oskar Kristeller (May 22, 1905 – June 7, 1999) was a scholar of Renaissance humanism. He was awarded the Haskins Medal in 1992. He was last active as Professor Emeritus of Philosophy at Columbia University in New York City, where he mentored A. James Gregor, Irving Louis Horowitz, and Richard Popkin.

== Life and career ==
During his university years he studied with Werner Jaeger, Heinrich Rickert, Richard Kroner, Karl Hampe, Friedrich Baethgen, Eduard Norden, and Ulrich von Wilamowitz-Moellendorff. He also attended lectures by noted philosophers such as Ernst Cassirer, Edmund Husserl, and Karl Jaspers. In 1928, he earned his doctorate from the University of Heidelberg under Ernst Hoffmann with a dissertation on Plotinus. He did postdoctoral work at the universities of Berlin and Freiburg. At Freiburg, Kristeller studied under the philosopher Martin Heidegger from 1931 to 1933.

The Nazi victory in 1933 forced Kristeller to move to Italy. At his arrival, Giovanni Gentile secured for him a position as lecturer in German at the Scuola Normale Superiore in Pisa. It was at the Scuola Normale that Kristeller completed his first great works on the Renaissance: the Supplementum Ficinianum (1937) and The Philosophy of Marsilio Ficino (1943). In 1939, he fled Italy, due to the enactment of Mussolini's August 1938 racial laws, to live in the USA. Thanks to the help of Yale University historian Roland Bainton, he sailed from Genoa in February 1939 and by March was teaching a graduate seminar at Yale on Plotinus. However, Kristeller taught for only a short time at Yale University until moving to Columbia University, where he taught until his retirement in 1973, as Frederick J. E. Woodbridge Professor of Philosophy. He continued to be an active researcher after he retired.

Paul Kristeller received a Guggenheim Fellowship in 1957, the Serena Medal of the British Academy in 1958, the Premio Internazionale Galileo Galilei in 1968, the Commendatore nell'Ordine al Merito della Repubblica Italiana in 1971, and a MacArthur Fellowship in 1984. He was three times (1954–55, 1961–62, 1968–69) a member at the Institute for Advanced Study in Princeton. He was elected to the American Academy of Arts and Sciences in 1955, to the Medieval Academy of America in 1959, and to the American Philosophical Society in 1974.

The emphasis of Kristeller's research was on the philosophy of Renaissance humanism. He is the author of important studies on Marsilio Ficino, Pietro Pomponazzi and Giambattista Vico.

An especially important achievement is his Iter Italicum (the title recalls Iter Alemannicum and other works of Martin Gerbert), a large work describing numerous uncatalogued manuscripts. After decades of neglect, Kristeller's lengthy, erudite essay of the early 1950s, "The Modern System of the Arts", in Journal of the History of Ideas, proved to be an influential, much reprinted classic reading in Philosophy of Art.

Kristeller was the chief inspirer of the Catalogus Translationum et Commentariorum, the ongoing project that aims to chart the fortune of all extant classical works through the Middle Ages and Renaissance, serving as Founder and Editor-in-Chief for the first two volumes and Associate Editor for the next five volumes.

== Works ==
- Der Begriff der Seele in der Ethik des Plotin. Tübingen: J. C. B. Mohr, 1929.
- The Renaissance Philosophy of Man. Chicago: The University of Chicago Press, 1950.
- "The Modern System of the Arts", in Journal of the History of Ideas, 12, 1951, p. 496-527 and 13, 17-46; repr. 1965 and 1980; new. ed. 1990.
- The Classics and Renaissance Thought. Cambridge: Harvard University Press, 1955.
- Studies in Renaissance Thought and Letters, vol. I-IV, Rome: Edizioni di Storia e Letteratura, 1956–1996.
- Iter Italicum. A Finding List of Uncatalogued or Incompletely Catalogued Humanistic Manuscripts of the Renaissance in Italian and Other Libraries, 7 vol., London: The Warburg Institute, 1963–1997.
- Eight Philosophers of the Italian Renaissance. Stanford: Stanford University Press, 1964.
- Die Philosophie des Marsilio Ficino. Frankfurt: Klostermann, 1972.
- Humanismus und Renaissance. 2 vol., Munich: Fink, 1974–1976
- Renaissance Thought and Its Sources. New York: Columbia University Press, 1979
- Die Ideen als Gedanken der menschlichen und göttlichen Vernunft. Heidelberg: Winter, 1989.
