= Aurelio Lippo Brandolini =

Italian humanist and political theorist

Aurelio Lippo Brandolini (1454? in Florence – 1497 in Rome) was an Italian humanist and political theorist who briefly flourished in the court of the Hungarian king, Matthias Corvinus, collaborating with Pietro Bono and Tinctoris. He is the author of the treatise Republics and Kingdoms Compared.

== Facts ==
On March 7, 1483, the feast of St. Thomas Aquinas, Brandolini delivered the annual encomium in honor of the "angelic doctor" for the Santa Maria sopra Minerva studium generale, the future Pontifical University of St. Thomas Aquinas, Angelicum.

Brandolini said the funerary oration over Matthias Corvinus.

Brandolini entered the Augustinian order late in life.

== Works ==
- Oratio de virtutibus domini nostri Jesu Christi. Romae: ex typographia D. Basae, 1596
- F. Aurelii Brandolini Augustiniani cognomento Lippi De ratione scribendi libri tres, in quibus vir ille doctissimus plura etiam, quae a veteribus de arte dicendi tradita sunt...Accessit eiusdem Lippi Oratio laudatissima de Passione Domini.... [Basle]: Per Ioan. Oporinum, et haeredes Ioan Heruagij, 1565. Londini: Apud Henricum Middletonum, 1573
- Lippi Brandolini De humanae vitae conditione, et toleranda corporis aegritudine: ...dialogus. Adiecimus alterae huic editioni. De exilaratione animi, in mortis angore Aymari Falconei Thautani dialogum, opuscolum ... Basle: R. Winter, 1543. Parisiis: apud Federicum Morellum ..., 1562
- Oratio pro Antonio Lauredano oratore Veneto ad principem et senatum Venetum.

== Editions ==
- James Hankins (ed.), Aurelio Lippo Brandolini, Republics and Kingdoms Compared (Cambridge, Mass.: Harvard University Press, 2009) (The I Tatti Renaissance Library; 40); *
- Review of this edition, with more information

== Studies ==
- E. Rummel, “In Defense of Theologizing Humanists: Aurelio Brandolini’s ‘In sacram Ebreorum historiam … praefatio” in G. Tournoy, ed., Humanistica Lovaniensia 44 (1995): 90-106.
