= Villa di Castello =

15th Century Italian villa

Coordinates: 43°49′10.01″N 11°13′41.46″E

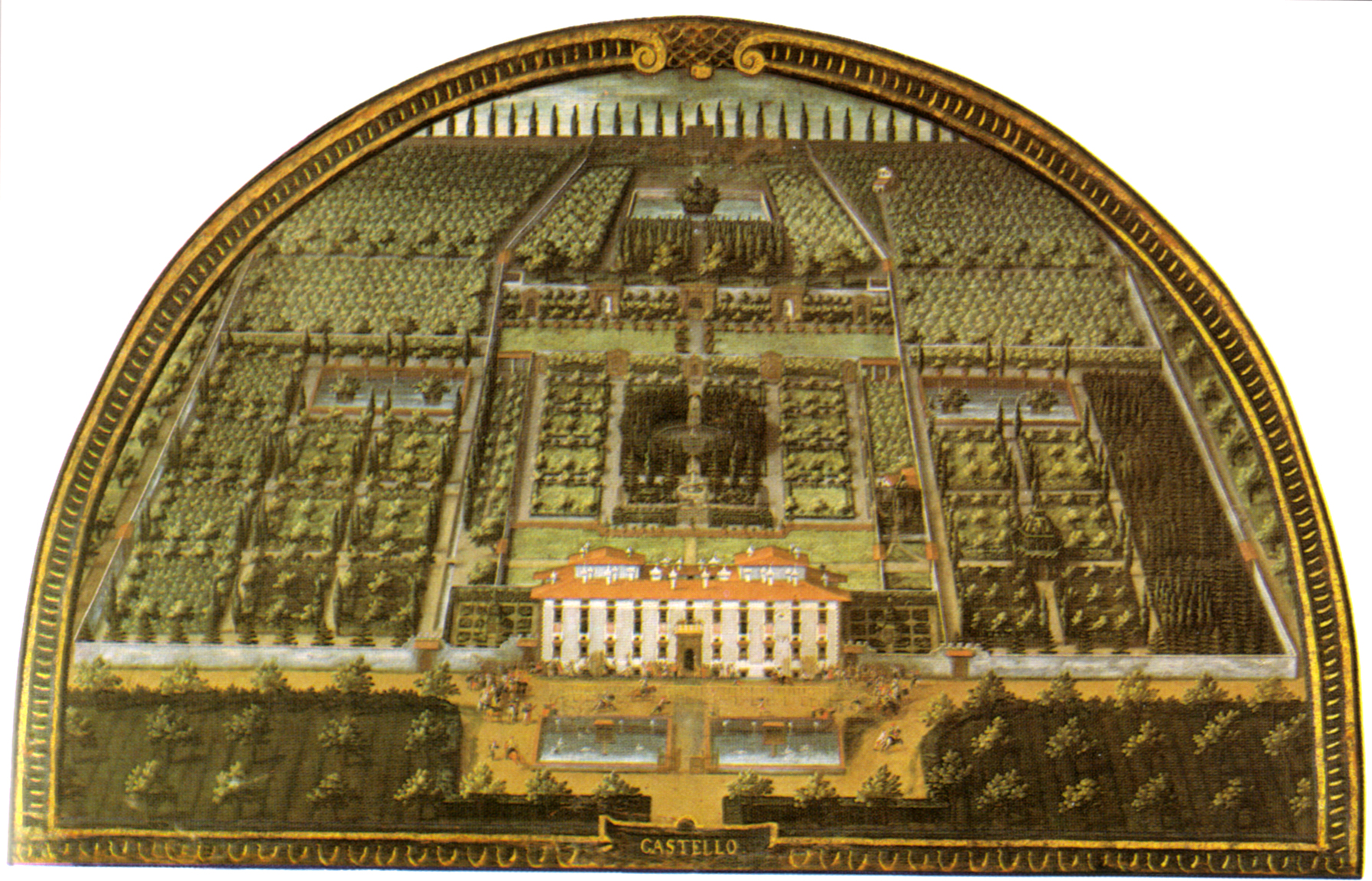
Lunette of Villa di Castello as it appeared in 1599, painted by Giusto Utens

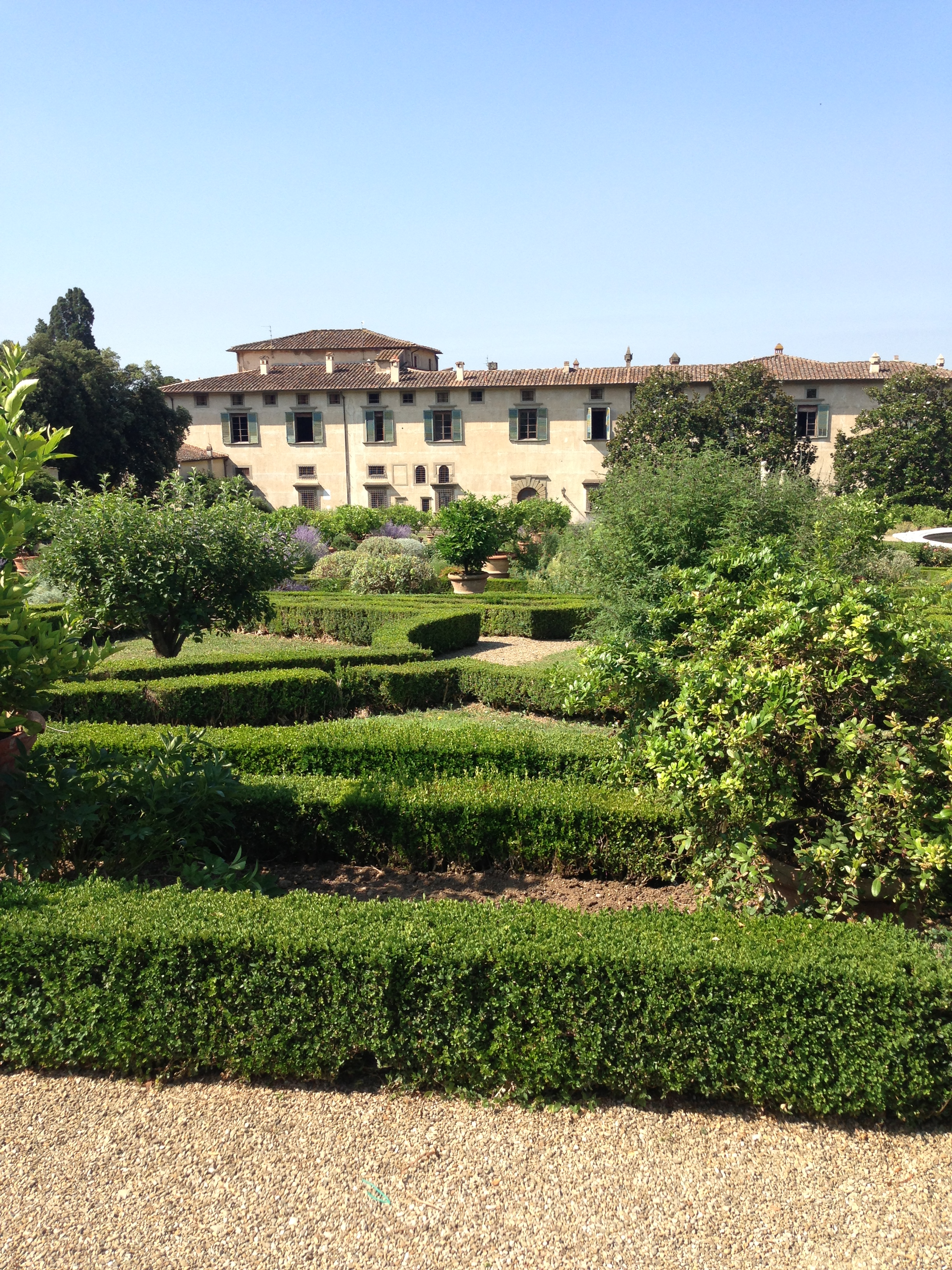
The villa and garden of Villa di Castello in July 2013

The Villa di Castello, near the hills bordering Florence, Tuscany, central Italy, was the country residence of Cosimo I de' Medici, Grand Duke of Tuscany (1519-1574). The gardens, filled with fountains, statuary, and a grotto, became famous throughout Europe. The villa also housed some of the great art treasures of Florence, including Sandro Botticelli's Renaissance masterpieces The Birth of Venus and Primavera. The gardens of the Villa had a profound influence upon the design of the Italian Renaissance garden and the later French formal garden.

== History ==
Villa Castello is located at the foot of the hills northwest of Florence, near the town of Sesto Fiorentino. The villa was located near a Roman aqueduct, and took its name from the water cisterns (castella) near the site.

A fortified building had been standing on the site since at least 1427, and was purchased in 1477 by Lorenzo and his brother Giovanni di Pierfrancesco de' Medici. This the year after their father died at the age of 46, leaving the young boys wards of their cousin Lorenzo il Magnifico, of the senior branch of the Medici family and de facto ruler of Florence.

They reconstructed the old building, adding a courtyard, a loggia, kitchens and stables. The house was inherited by a famed condottiere, or mercenary soldier, Giovanni dalle Bande Nere and his wife, Maria Salviati, the parents of Cosimo, who was born in 1519, and lived in the house as a child.

In 1537, the 26-year-old Duke of Florence, Alessandro de' Medici, was assassinated, and Cosimo, though he was only seventeen and a relatively unknown member of the Medici family, was elected by the influential men of Florence to replace him. They were under the impression that they could control him, but they were mistaken. In 1537, the young Cosimo faced a rebellion by a faction which wanted to restore the Republic of Florence. He defeated them at the Battle of Montemurlo, and established himself as the unrivaled ruler of the city.

=== The design and construction of the garden ===
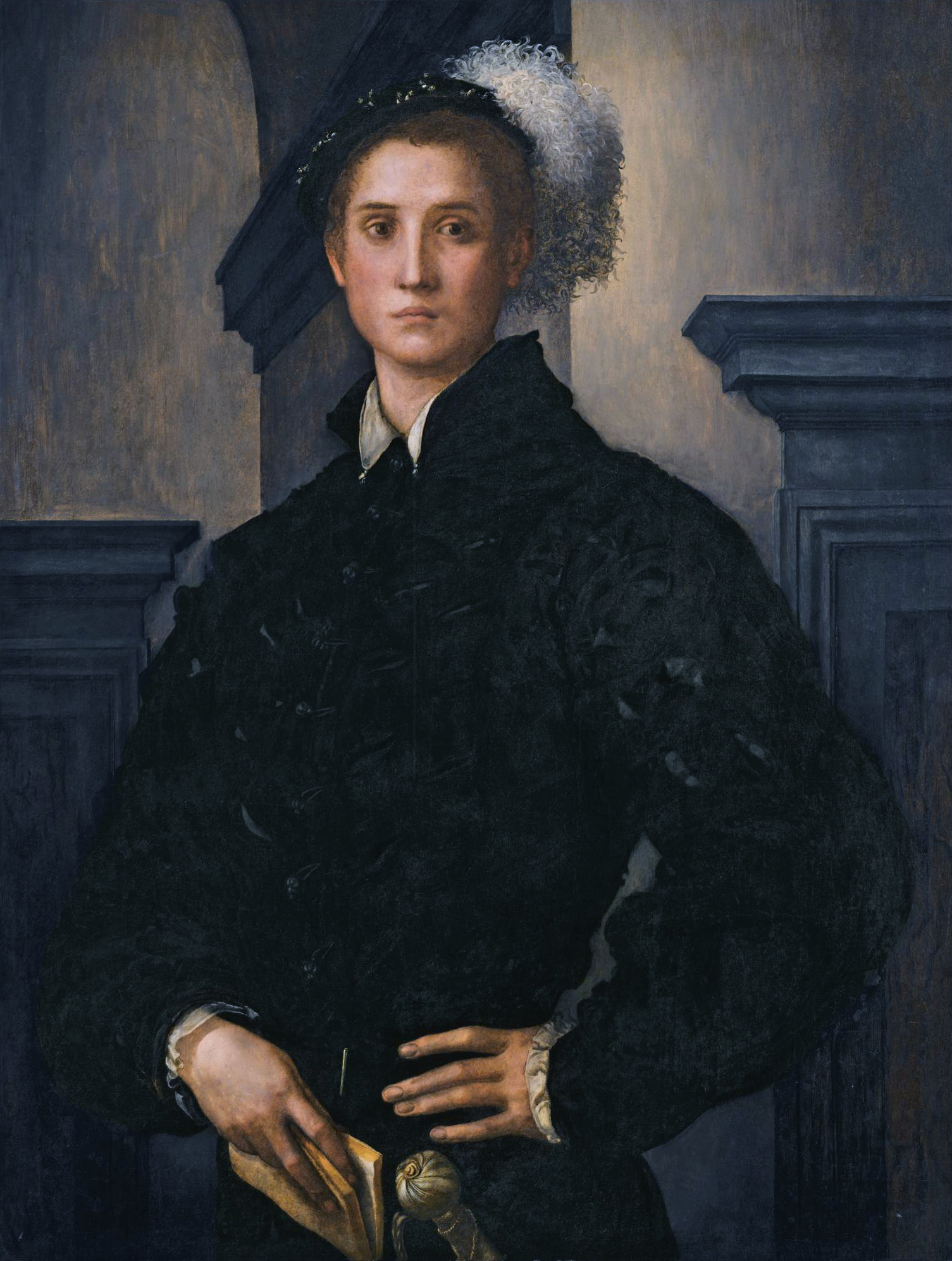
Cosimo I de Medici, 19 years of age, at the time he was building the gardens of Villa di Castello (Jacopo Pontormo, c. 1538)

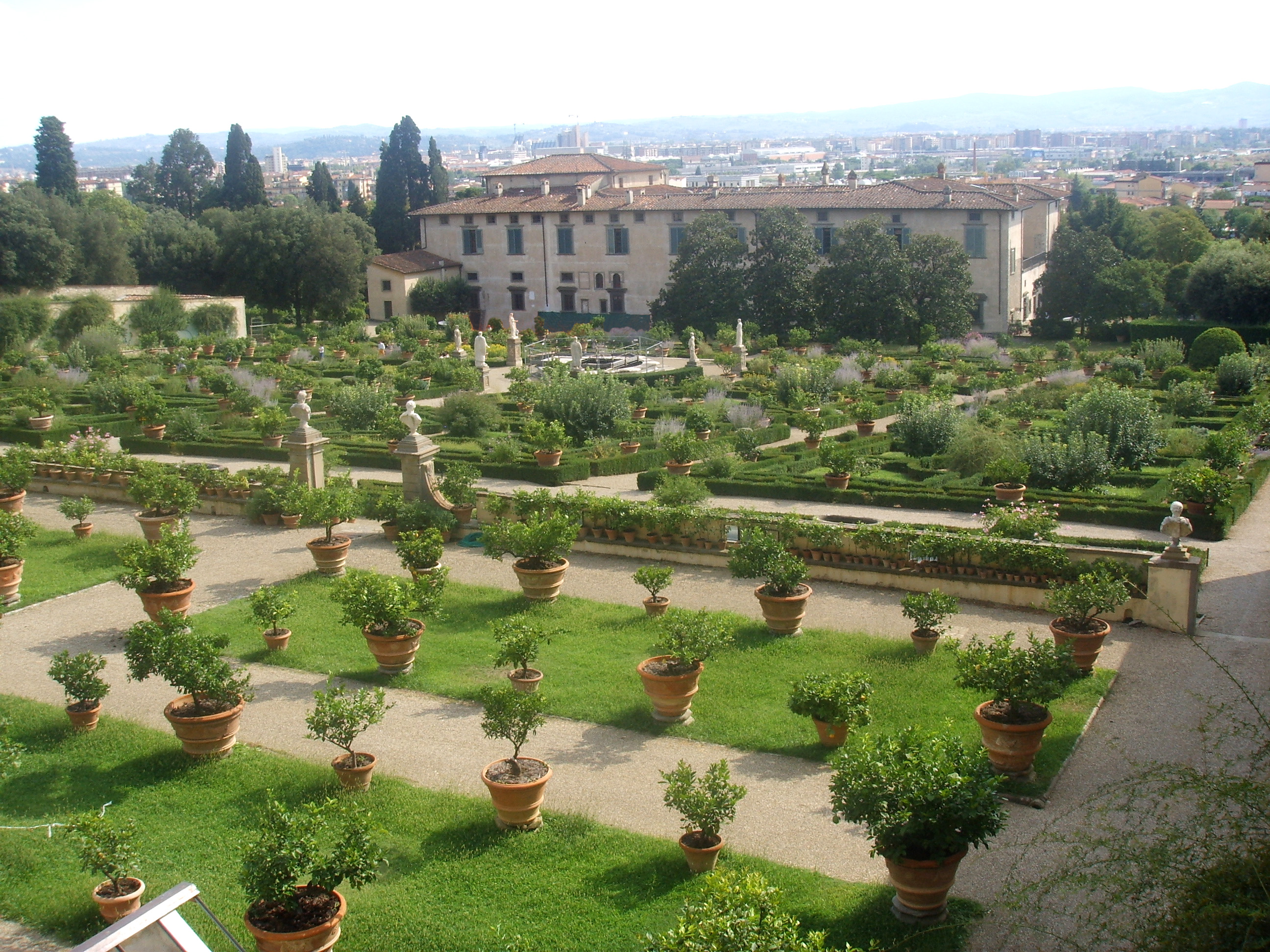
The villa and gardens seen from the upper garden. The garden plan was based on harmony and order, the principles upon which Cosimo planned to rule Florence.

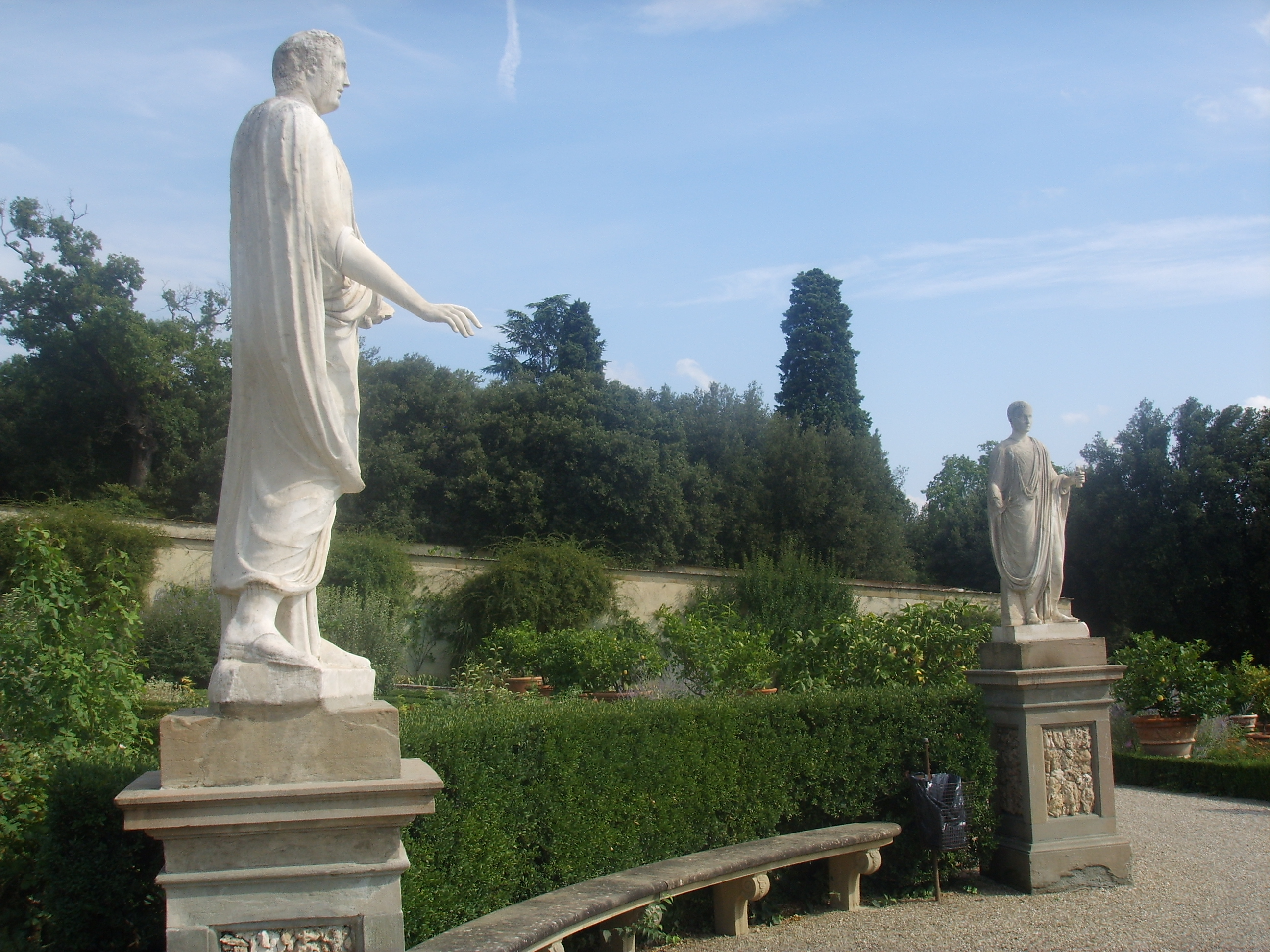
The garden was filled with statuary associating the virtues of ancient Rome with the power and virtue of the ruler of Florence.

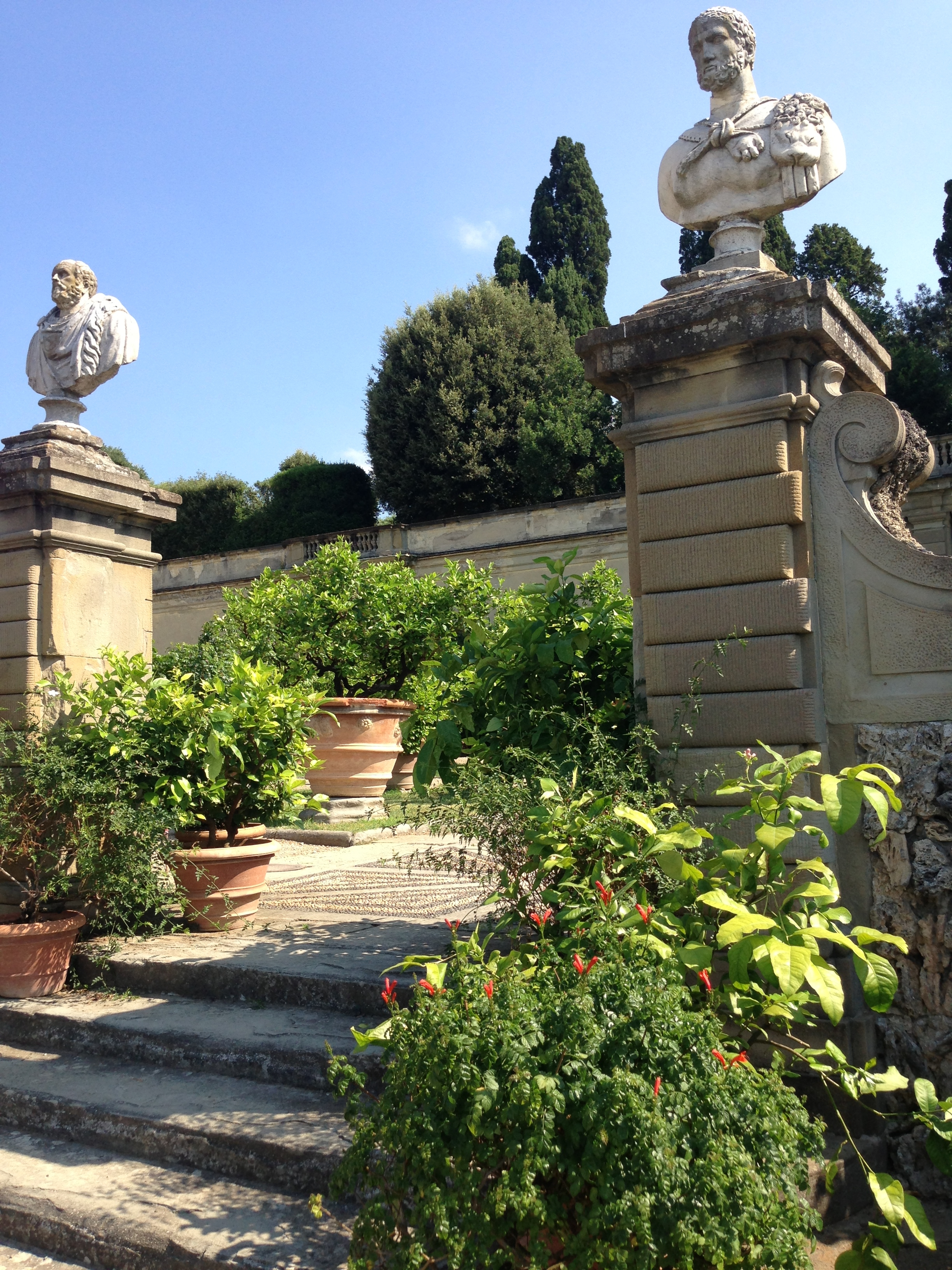
Climbing through the garden, visitors saw busts of the Medici dynasty in Roman costume.

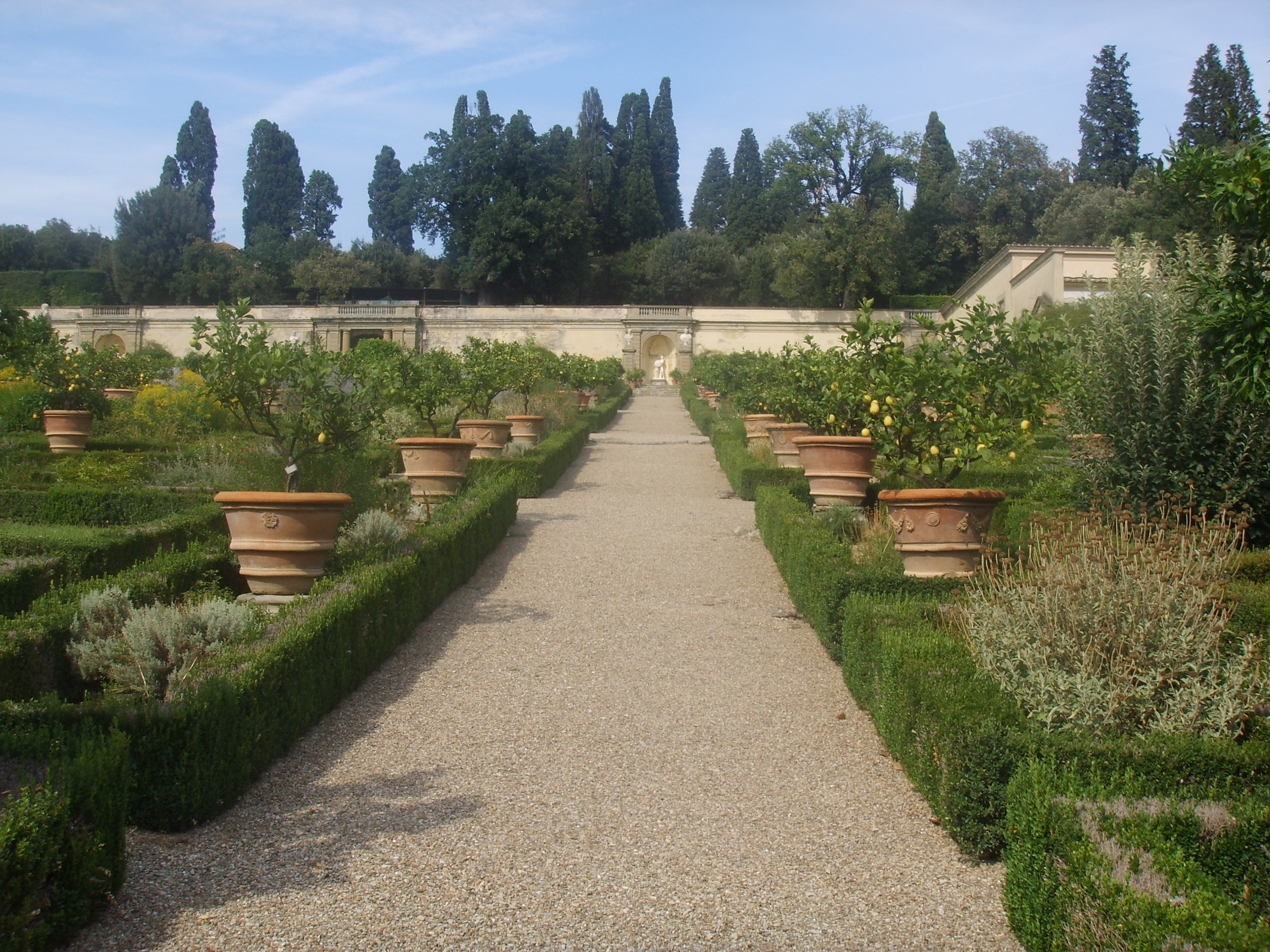
The citrus garden contains more than five hundred pots of lemon and orange trees.

Once his power was secure, Cosimo began to spend more time at his villa in Castello. As the architect and writer Giorgio Vasari wrote, "At this place the Duke began to build a little, one thing after another, to the end that he might reside there more commodiously, himself and his court."

Cosimo commissioned the engineer Piero da San Casciano to construct a system of aqueducts to bring water to the villa and its gardens, the sculptor Niccolò Tribolo to create fountains, statues and a garden, and the architect Giorgio Vasari to restore and enlarge the villa.

First, under the direction of Piero da San Casciano, an aqueduct was constructed from the Castella higher up the slope of Monte Morello to a small reservoir he built on the hill above the villa. Later, when more water was needed, a second aqueduct was built from another spring at Petraia.

Tribolo's design for the garden was described in great detail in Vasari's Lives of the Artists. The garden was laid out on the site of original walled garden, which ran from the villa up the gentle slope toward the mountain. On the hillside above the back wall of the garden, where the water reservoir was located, Tribolo created a bosco, or a simulated natural forest, separated from the garden by a high retaining wall. Below this, he divided the old walled garden into two by another wall, and carved out a small upper terrace and a large lower terrace, connected by two ornamental stairways. The smaller upper garden was planted with orange and lemon trees, trained to grow up the walls. It also contained, in the center of the back wall, the entrance to the grotto, a small cave whose walls resembled a natural cavern, richly decorated and filled with sculpture.

The larger lower garden was divided into squares, like small rooms, divided by paths and bordered by hedges and rows of cedar and olive trees, and filled with flower beds. In the center of the terrace was a circular labyrinth of cypress trees interplanted with laurel, myrtle and roses. In the center of the labyrinth was fountain crowned by a statue of Venus. A second, larger fountain, crowned with a bronze statue of Hercules defeating Antaeus, was located between the labyrinth and the villa.

=== The water in the garden ===
The hydraulic system of the garden was one of the wonders of the High Renaissance, and also played an important part in the symbolism of the garden. In the center of the reservoir above the garden, in the "sacred wood," was a statue of Appenino, symbolizing the mountains of Tuscany, portrayed as an old man shivering, with water pouring over his head. Water flowed from the reservoir down bronze pipes and emerged in two fountains built in the retaining wall on either side of grotto, representing the two rivers of Florence. Water also flowed into the grotto, running down the walls. The two "rivers" flowed in channels through the garden, while other pipes carried water to the two fountains.

All fountains during the Renaissance depended upon gravity, and the elevation of the water source above the fountain, to make the water shoot upwards. Because the water source for the fountain of Hercules and Antaeus was on the hillside high above the fountain, a jet of water spouted a full three meters above his mouth.

Once it had passed through the fountains, the water flowed in two separate channels into two small private gardens on either side of the villa, and then entered two large fishponds in front of the villa. After that, the water was used to irrigate the fields and gardens below.

The garden also contained a series of ingenious giochi d'acqua, or "water features", to entertain the Duke and his visitors. The grotto was designed so that, by turning a key, the gate would lock guests inside the grotto and they would be soaked with water from hidden pipes. The fountain of Hercules was to be surrounded by a circle of trees, and also by a hidden pipe. By turning another key, spectators looking at the fountain would be sprayed with water from hidden nozzles. There was also a small house located in the branches of an enormous oak tree, just east of the garden. The house was reached by a stairway, and contained a marble table and a fountain served by pipes from the reservoir.

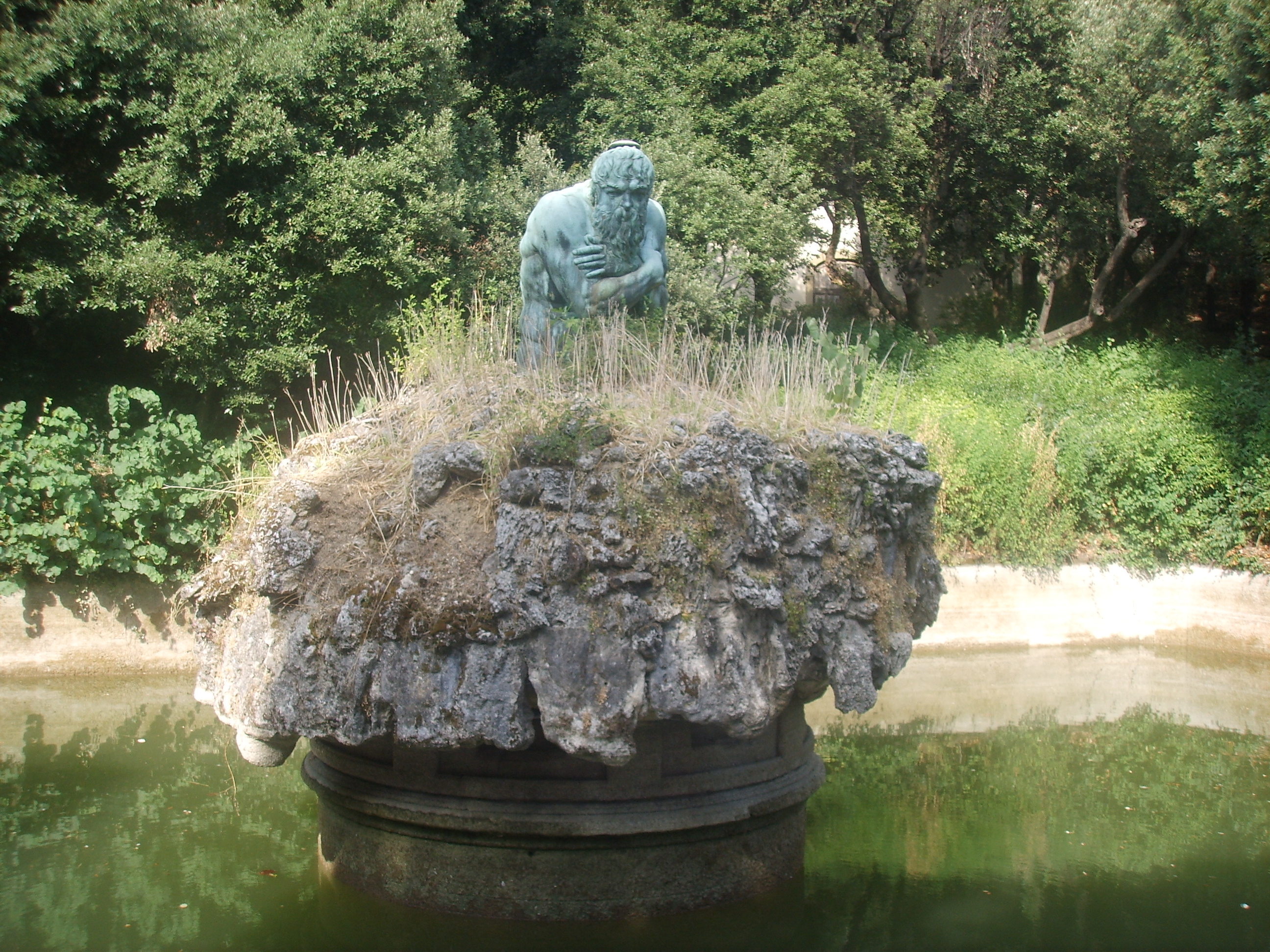
The Fountain of Appenino, by Bartolomeo Ammannati (1563), represented the mountain source of the rivers of Florence. The lake feeds the fountains in the garden below.

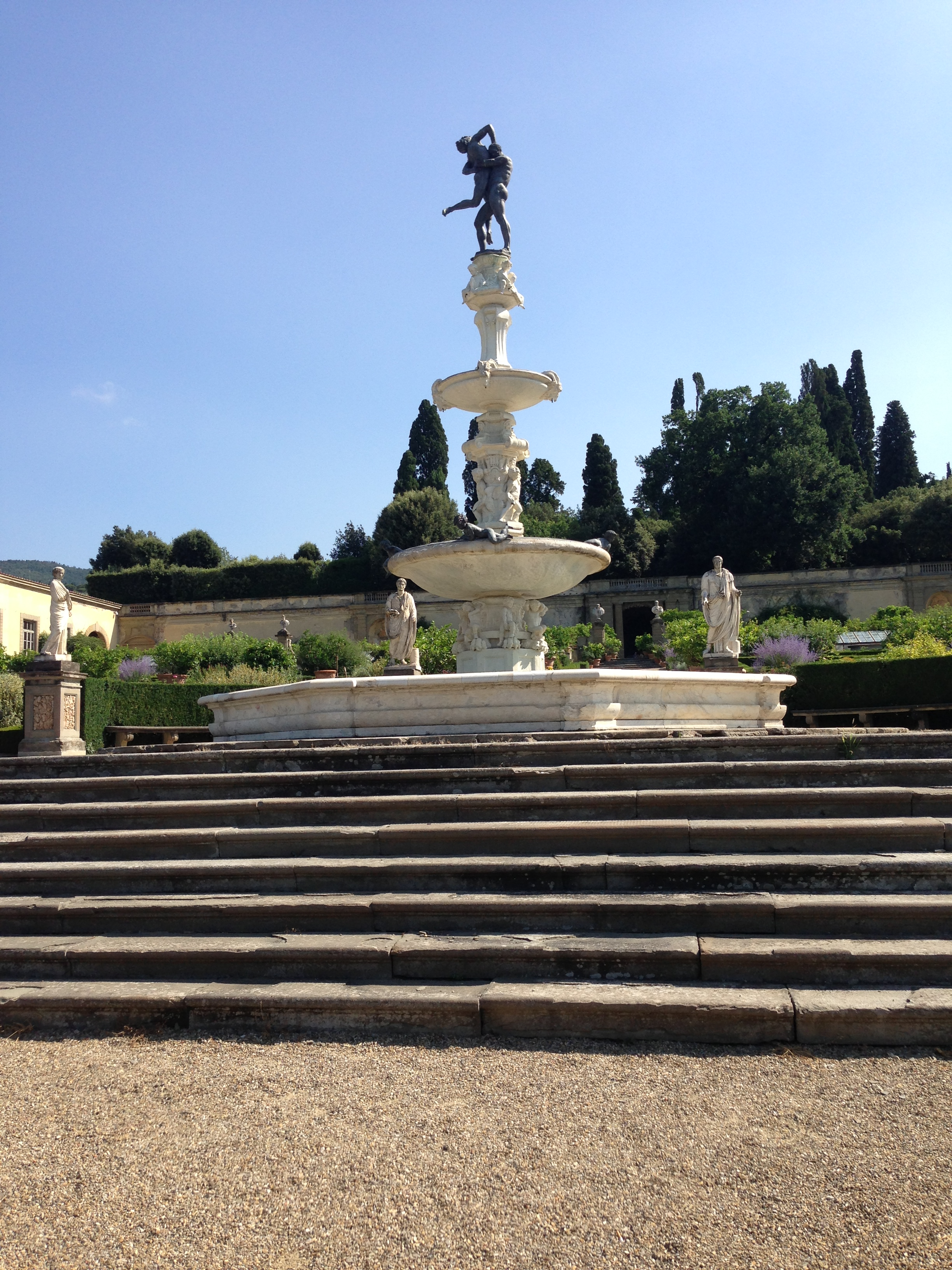
The fountain of Hercules and Antaeus symbolized how Cosimo had defeated the enemies of Florence through his intelligence.

=== The symbolism of the garden ===
The garden was designed to deliver a clear political message; that, after a long period of warfare and suffering, Cosimo was going to lead Florence into a new Golden Age, with peace, prosperity, and harmony. Tribolo placed symbolic messages all throughout the garden. The fountain of Hercules and Antaeus showed how Cosimo, like Hercules, had defeated his enemies by wisdom, rather than just brute strength. The fountain of Venus was a tribute to Venus, one of the symbols of Florence; It was also a reminder that Venus had ruled over the isles of the Hesperides. Venus was also honored inside the Villa, where Cosimo placed the famous painting by Botticelli, the Birth of Venus. Tribolo continued the message with statuary throughout the garden. The stairways were decorated with busts of the earlier Medici rulers, in Roman costumes. Tribolo planned to place other statues around the gardens representing the four seasons, and the virtues of the House of Medici: justice, compassion, valor, nobility, wisdom, and liberality.

=== The garden under the Medici ===
The garden was not only a form of political theater; it was also a pleasure garden. Cosimo's letters report that he spent many long summer afternoons with his family, enjoying the coolness of the shade and the fountains. Important visitors to Florence visited the gardens, and their fame spread around Europe.

Unfortunately, Tribolo did not have the time to complete all of his project, because, as Vasari wrote, "of his being too much occupied with the affairs of the Duke." He was able to personally finish the two major fountains, and the two rivers, but not the other works. He died in 1550, and the statues for the fountains were finished by his pupil, Antonio di Gino.

Work on the villa and gardens continued for twenty years, and Cosimo had more ambitious plans, including a project for a second villa, as large as the first, connected to it by a loggia, but this was never begun. The Duke became occupied in other projects. He began making new apartments in the Palazzo Vecchio, and he purchased the Pitti Palace in 1549, and began building the Boboli garden, with more fountains and an even larger grotto, decorated with statues by Michelangelo. Struck by the death of two of his sons from malaria, he retired from political life, turned over power his heir, Francesco I de' Medici, Grand Duke of Tuscany, and spent the last ten years of his life in the villa and gardens.

Cosimo died in 1574, and a long succession of other Medicis occupied the Villa. Ferdinando I de' Medici, completed the villa in its present form, between 1588 and 1595, enlarging the east side, remaking the facade, and adding a new entrance on the south side. Don Lorenzo de' Medici commissioned the painter Il Volterrano to decorate the villa with a fresco, Vigilance and Sleep, in 1640. Cosimo III de' Medici, deeply interested in botany, introduced a very rare species of Indian jasmine, called mugherino, in 1688, and built a special greenhouse to protect it in winter. During the Medici years, many foreign travelers, including Michel de Montaigne and the botanist Pierre Belon, visited the villa and wrote descriptions, which made it known throughout Europe. It inspired other European gardens which were designed to illustrate the grandeur, wisdom and power of the ruler.

=== The later years ===
When the Medici dynasty became extinct in 1737, the villa was inherited by the Habsburg-Lorraine dynasty. The new owners saw the villa and garden as a practical enterprise rather than a political symbol; they enlarged the collection of citrus trees and built two limonaie, or lemon houses, but at the same time they dismantled several fountains, cut off the water to the grotto, and destroyed the maze of trees. In 1788 they transferred the fountain of Florence to the neighboring Villa La Petraia, and moved the monumental fountain of Hercules and Antaeus to the middle of the garden. The Medici symbolism of the two rivers reuniting and the classical virtues of Medici rulers was erased.

A number of neo-classical murals were painted in the villa during the time of Napoleon Bonaparte, but after that the villa and garden went into a long period of neglect and decay. It was donated to the Italian state in 1919, and served variously as a dormitory for gardeners, school, and hospital. The house became the property of the Accademia della Crusca, which owns it today. The garden became a national museum in 1984.

The villa gave its name to the Castello Plan, an early city map of Lower Manhattan (New Amsterdam the later New York City) from 1660, which was found in the villa in 1900 and printed in 1916.

== The features of the garden ==
=== The fountain of Hercules and Antaeus ===
The fountain of Hercules and Antaeus, designed by Niccolò Tribolo, was the most prominent and famous landmark of the garden. It illustrates the legend of Antaeus, a giant who challenged travelers along a road to fight, and killed them. He was finally challenged by Hercules, who realized that the power of Antaeus came from his contact with the earth. Hercules lifted Antaeus from the ground and crushed him to death. The statue symbolized the victory of Cosimo de' Medici over the enemies of Florence, particularly the rebels who tried to depose him in the early months after he became Duke.

Tribolo decorated The fountain from top to bottom with marble and bronze sculptures. The marble pool into which the water poured had eight sides, as did the base of the fountain. Around the base were marble statues of children, life sized and in full relief, protected by the tazza, or basin above as if they were sheltering from the rain. The basin, according to Vasari, "sends a very beautiful rain, like the dripping of a roof." There were more bronze figures around the lip of the tazza, holding festoons of products of the sea. The smaller tazza above was also supported by statues of children. Four heads of capricorns, a combination of a fish and a ram, one of the emblems of the Medicin family, looked down from the upper basin. Above that basin, a pedestal was decorated with more figures of children. Atop the pedestal was the statue of Hercules and Antaeus,

At the very top was the statue of Hercules and Antaeus, designed by Tribolo but executed by Bartolomeo Ammannati. Vasari wrote: "From the mouth of this Antaeus he intended that, instead of his spirit, there should pour out through a pipe water in great abundance, as indeed it does." Because the reservoir providing the water for the fountain was located high above in the upper garden, the water spouted out of the mouth of Antaeus in a jet three meters high, visible all around the garden.

The fountain also has one other water feature: a hidden pipe with small nozzles was circled the fountain; by turning a key, the water could be turned on, drenching the spectators with fine jets of water.

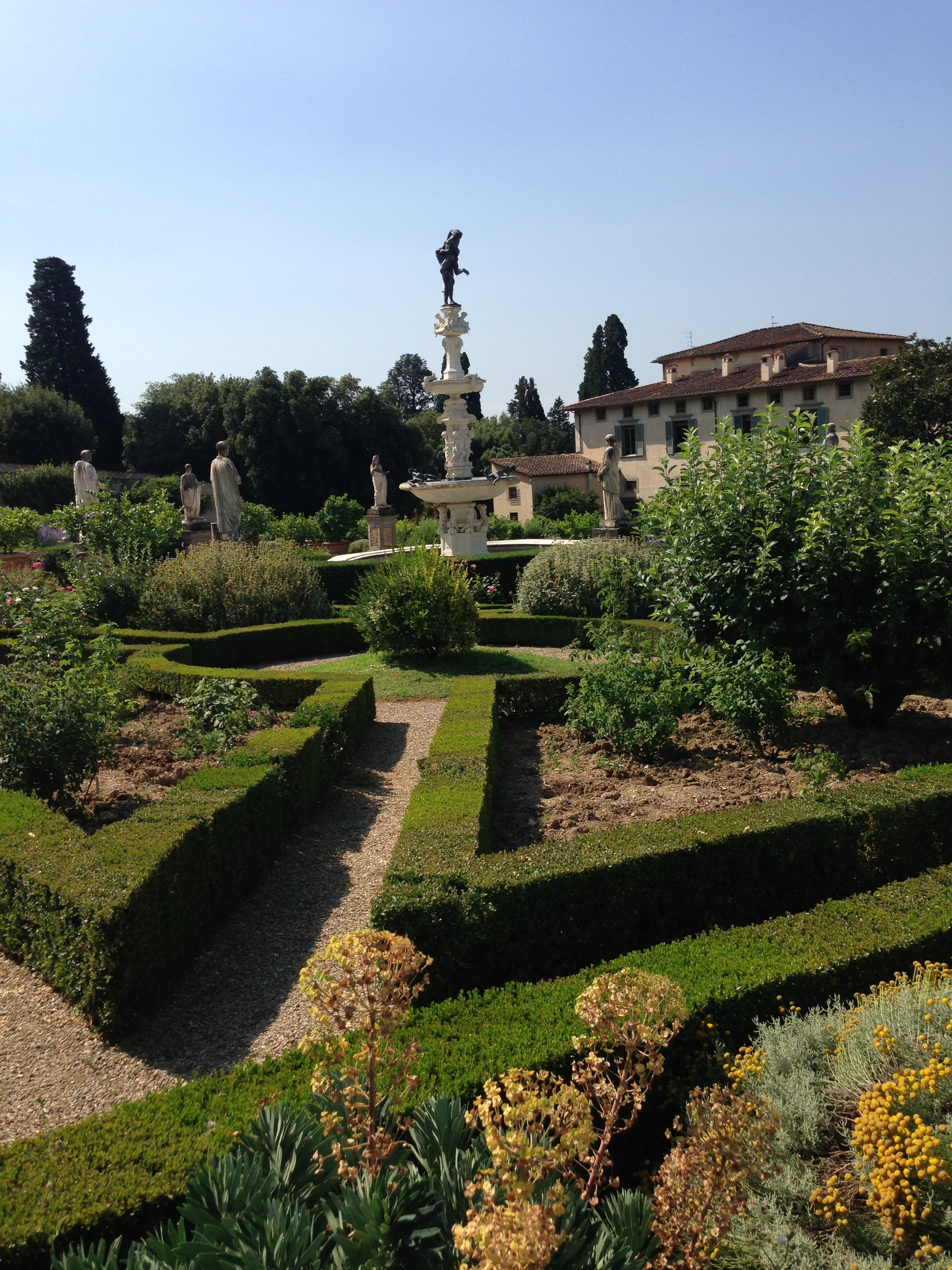
The fountain was originally surrounded by a labyrinth of trees, and also featured a water pipe with hidden nozzles, which could be turned on with a key to drench unsuspecting spectators.

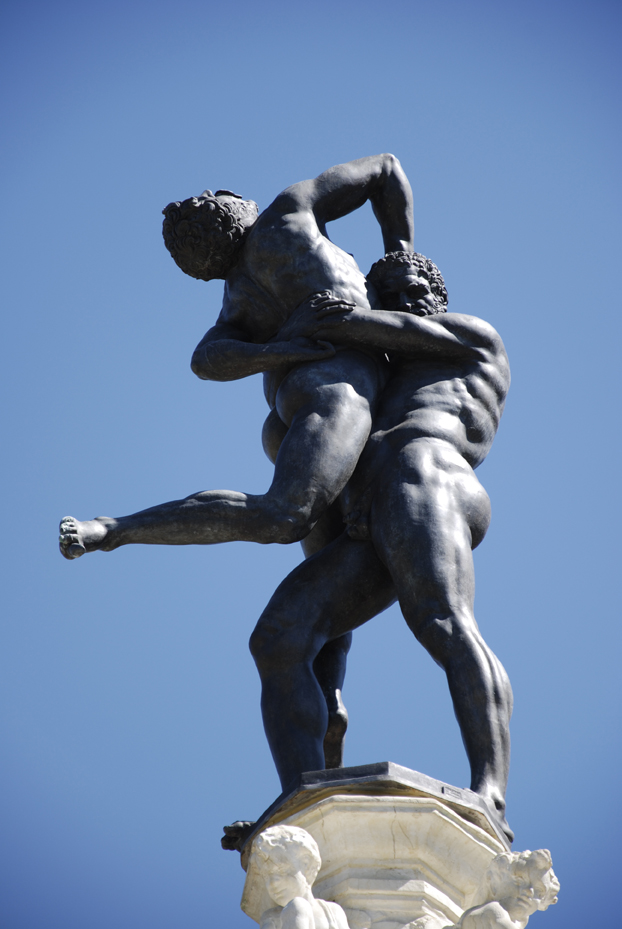
The figures of Hercules and Antaeus. Hercules has lifted Antaeus off his feet, depriving him of his power. Water spouted three meters upward from the mouth of Antaeus.

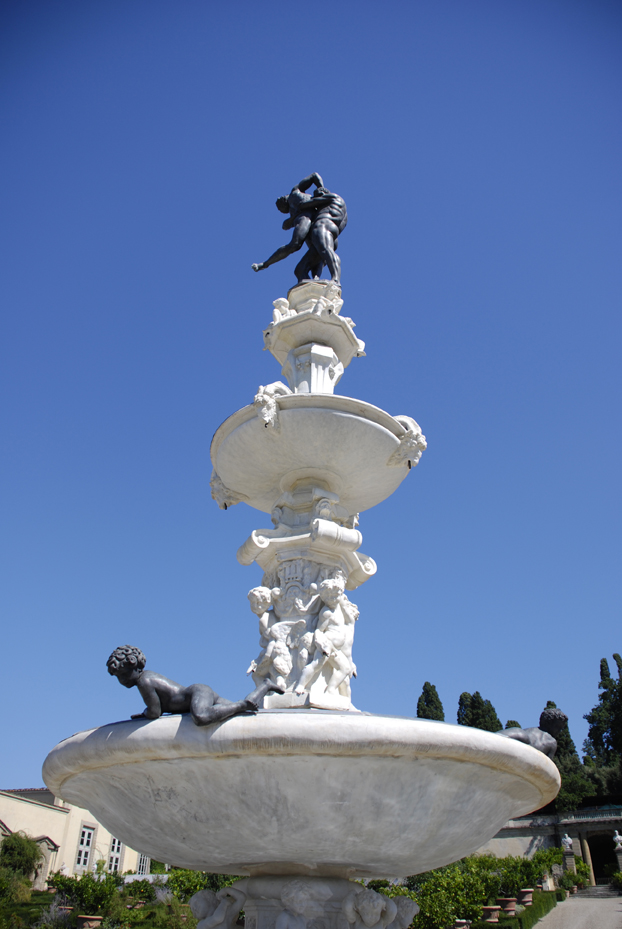
The upper level of the fountain. Four capricorns, one of the emblems of the Medici, look down from the upper basin.

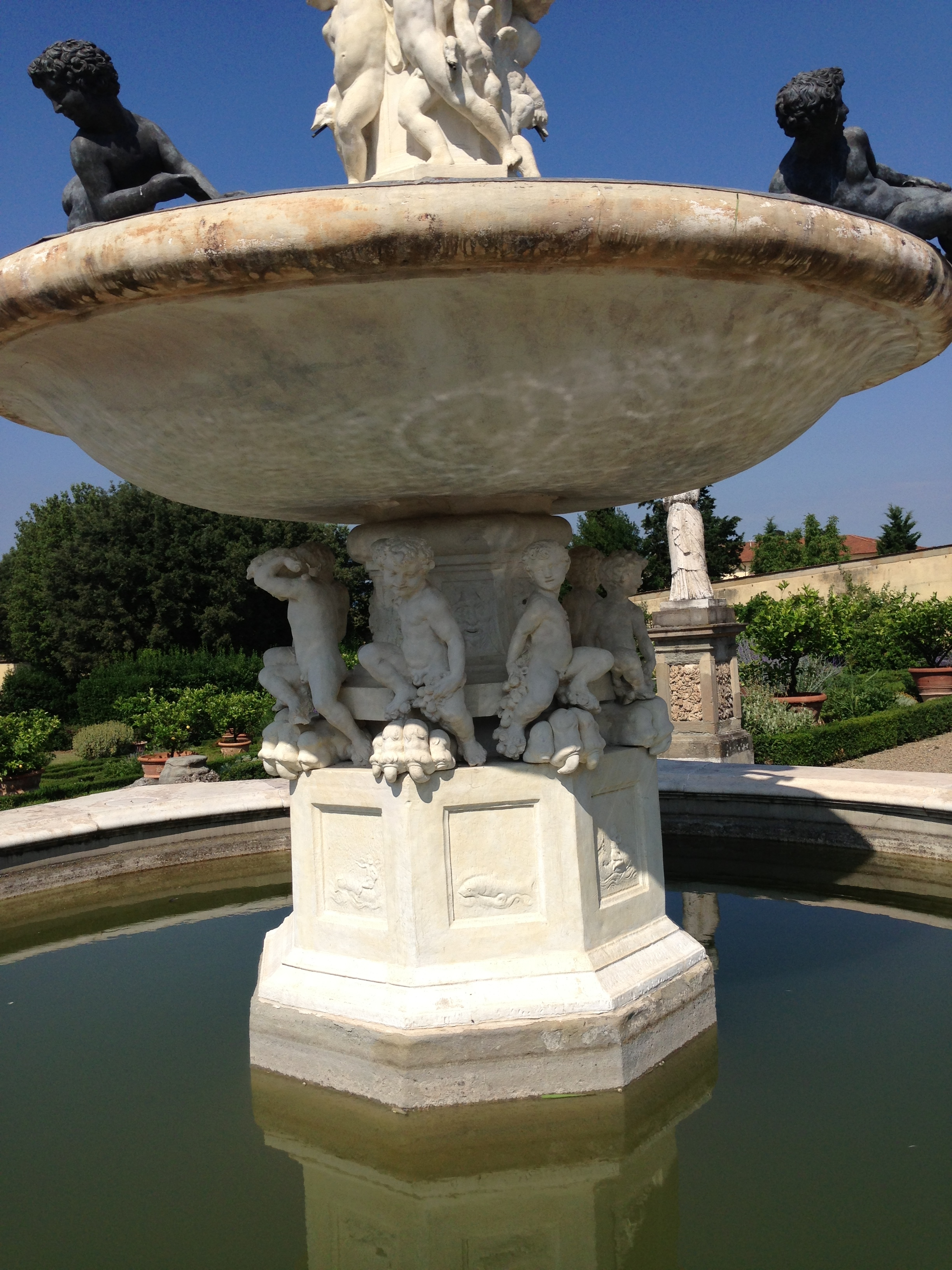
The eight-sided marble base of the fountain was decorated marble statues of life-size children, protected by the basin above as if they were taking shelter from the rain.

=== The fountain of Florence (Fiorenza) ===
The fountain of Florence, or Fiorenza, was originally located in the upper part of the garden, closer to the grotto, and it was surrounded by a maze of greenery. It was made to complement the Fountain of Hercules and Antaeus, lower in the garden. The itself made by Tribolo and his assistant, Pierino da Vinci, and it was crowned by a statue of a figure representing the goddess Venus or the City of Florence, by Giambologna The Venus-Florence figure referred to the goddess who ruled over the mythical Gardens of The Hesperides, and to the triumph achieved by Cosimo over the other cities of Tuscany. In 1788 the fountain was moved from Castello to the neighboring Villa La Petraia, also owned by the Medicis, where it can be seen today.

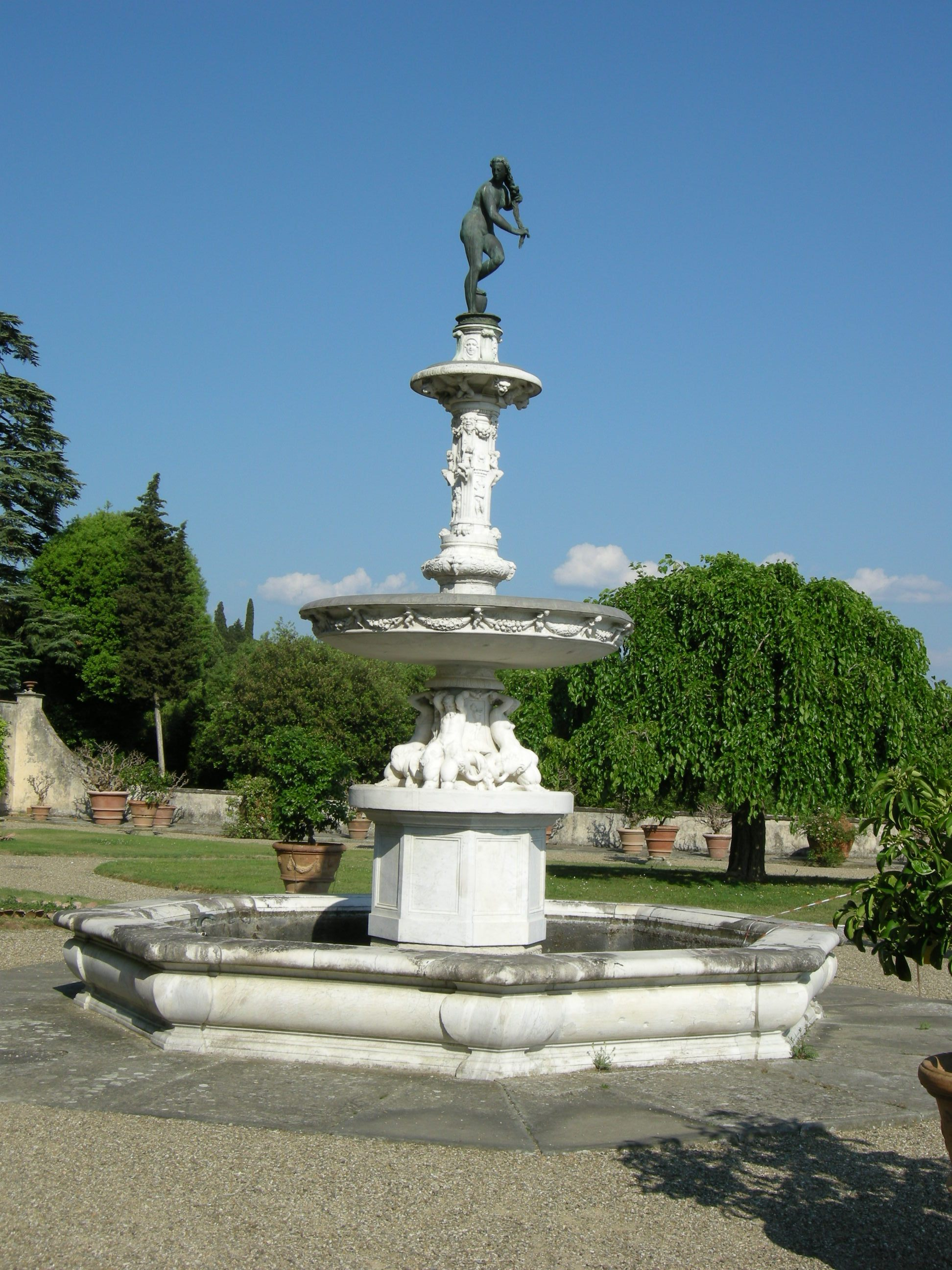
The Fountain of Florence, with a statue of Venus by Giambologna, originally stood in the upper part of the garden at Castello. It was moved in 1788 to the neighboring Villa Petraia, where it can be seen today.

=== The grotto of the animals ===
One of the most famous features of the garden was the grotta of the animals (also known as the grotto of the flood), a cave entered by a doorway in the upper wall of the garden. The walls of the cave were covered with limestone molded to resemble a natural cavern, embedded with stones, mosaic and seashells. In three chambers around the grotto were groups of birds and animals, made of multicolor bronze and marble. In each chamber there was also a large sculpted marble basin. When the grotta was operating, water streamed from the ceiling and walls into the marble basins. The grotto originally had a statue of Orpheus with a lyre standing in the center; the animals were listening to his music. The grotto also contained a water feature; the gate could be closed, and, with the turn of a key, visitors to the grotto were soaked with fine jets of water from a hidden pipes and nozzles.

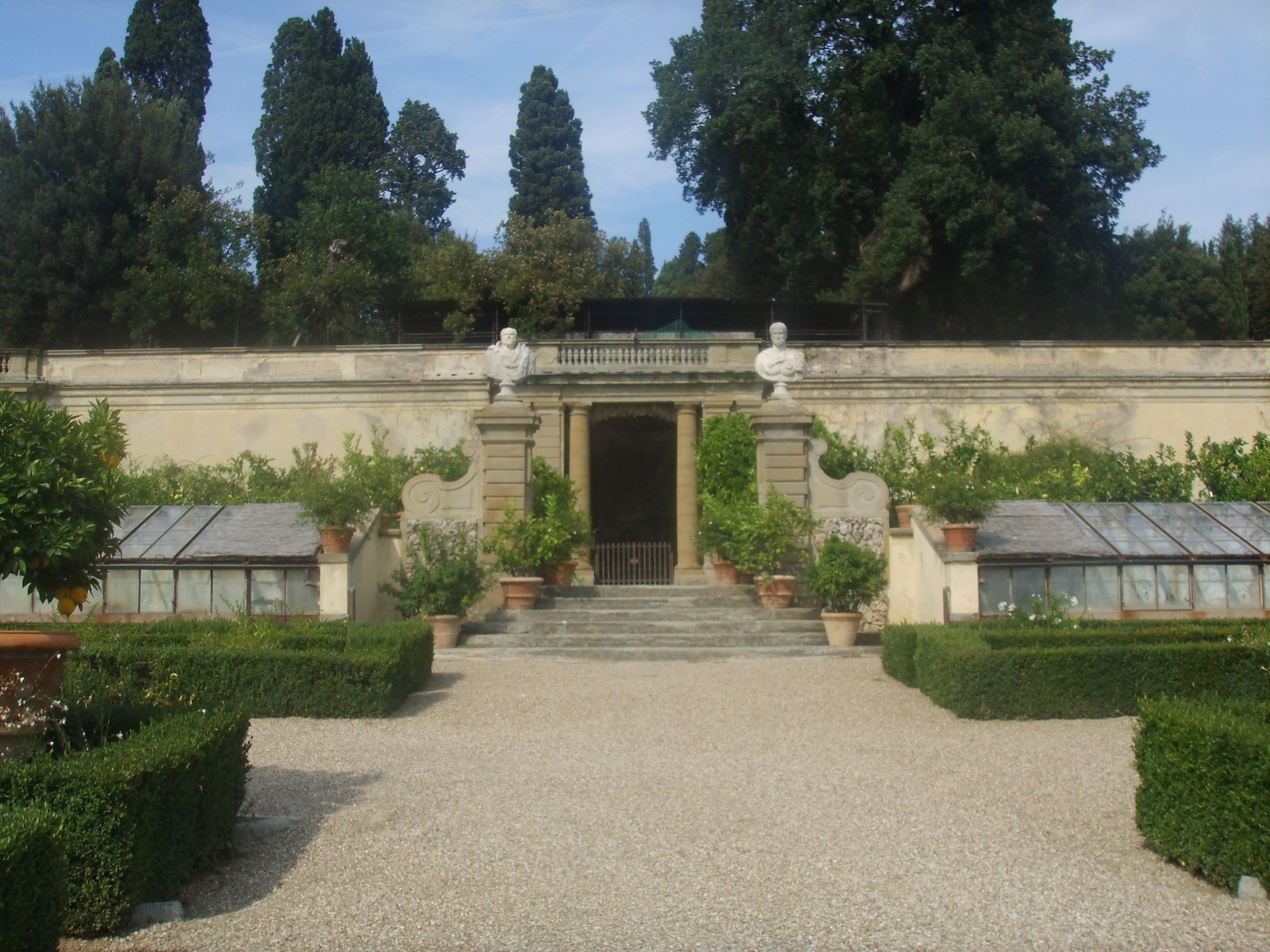
The entrance to the grotto, against the back wall of the garden.

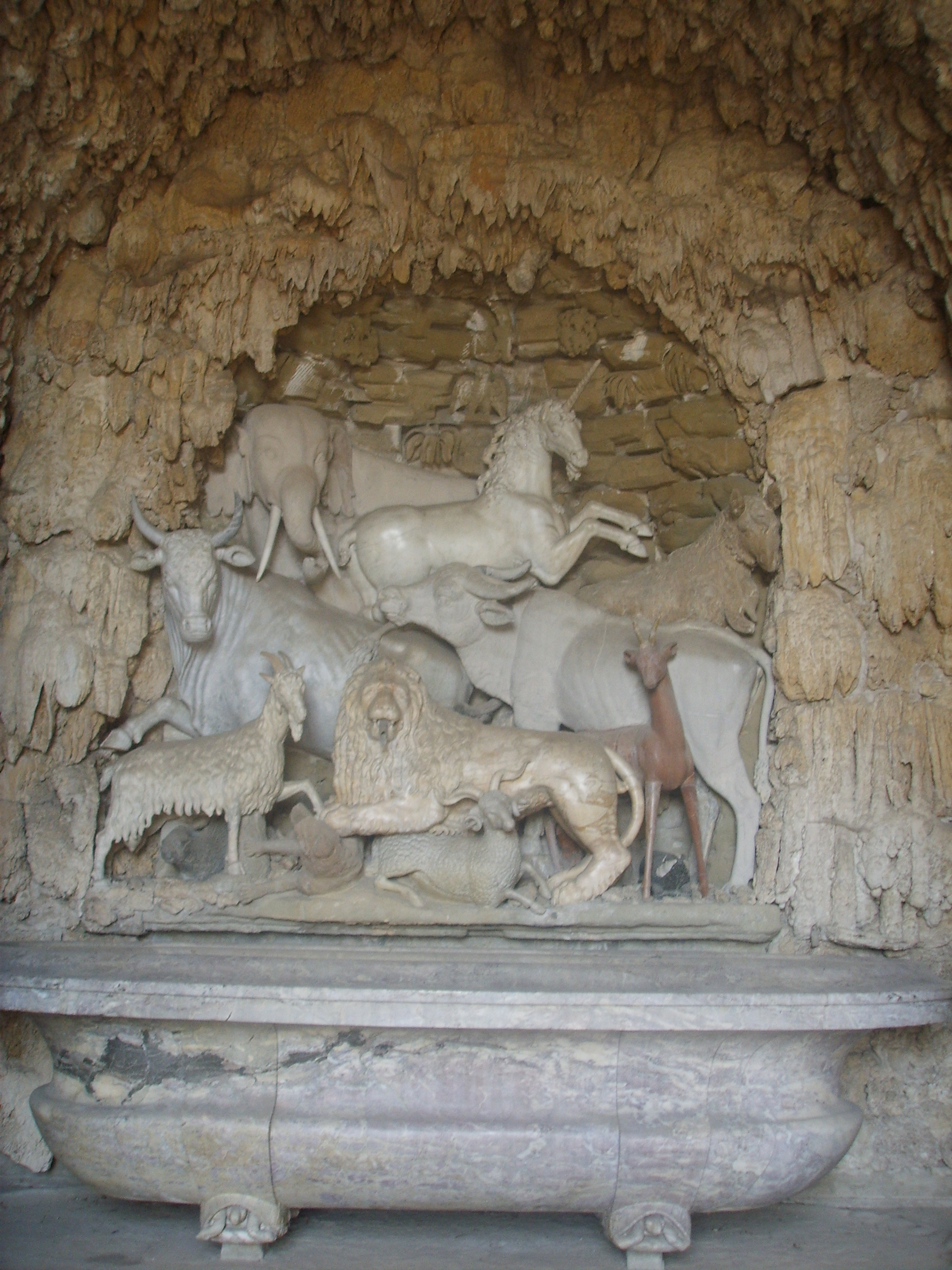
The central chamber of the grotto, with a unicorn. The original grotto featured a statue of Orpheus with his lyre in the center; the animals were listening to his music.

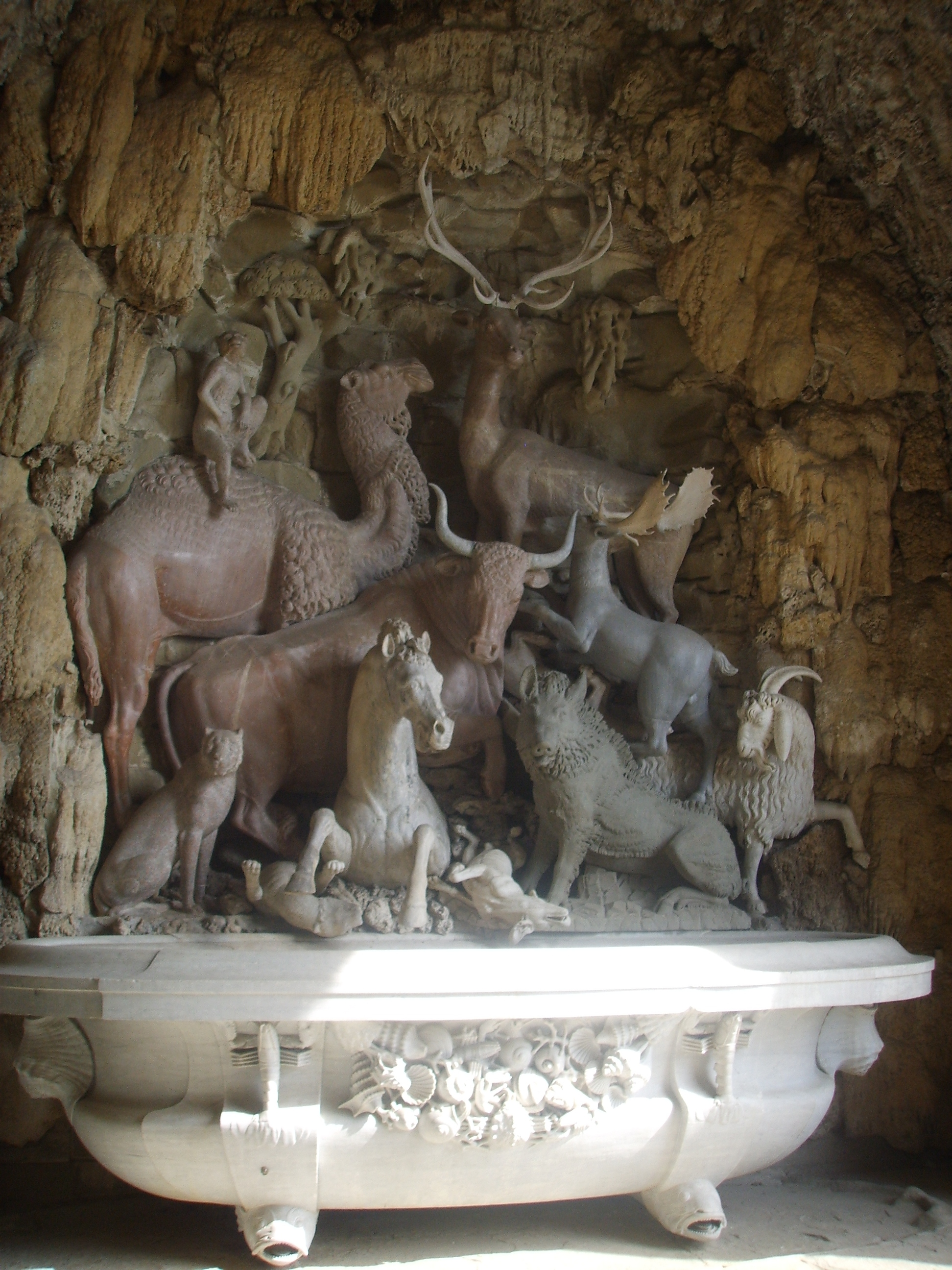
The right chamber of the grotto of the animals.

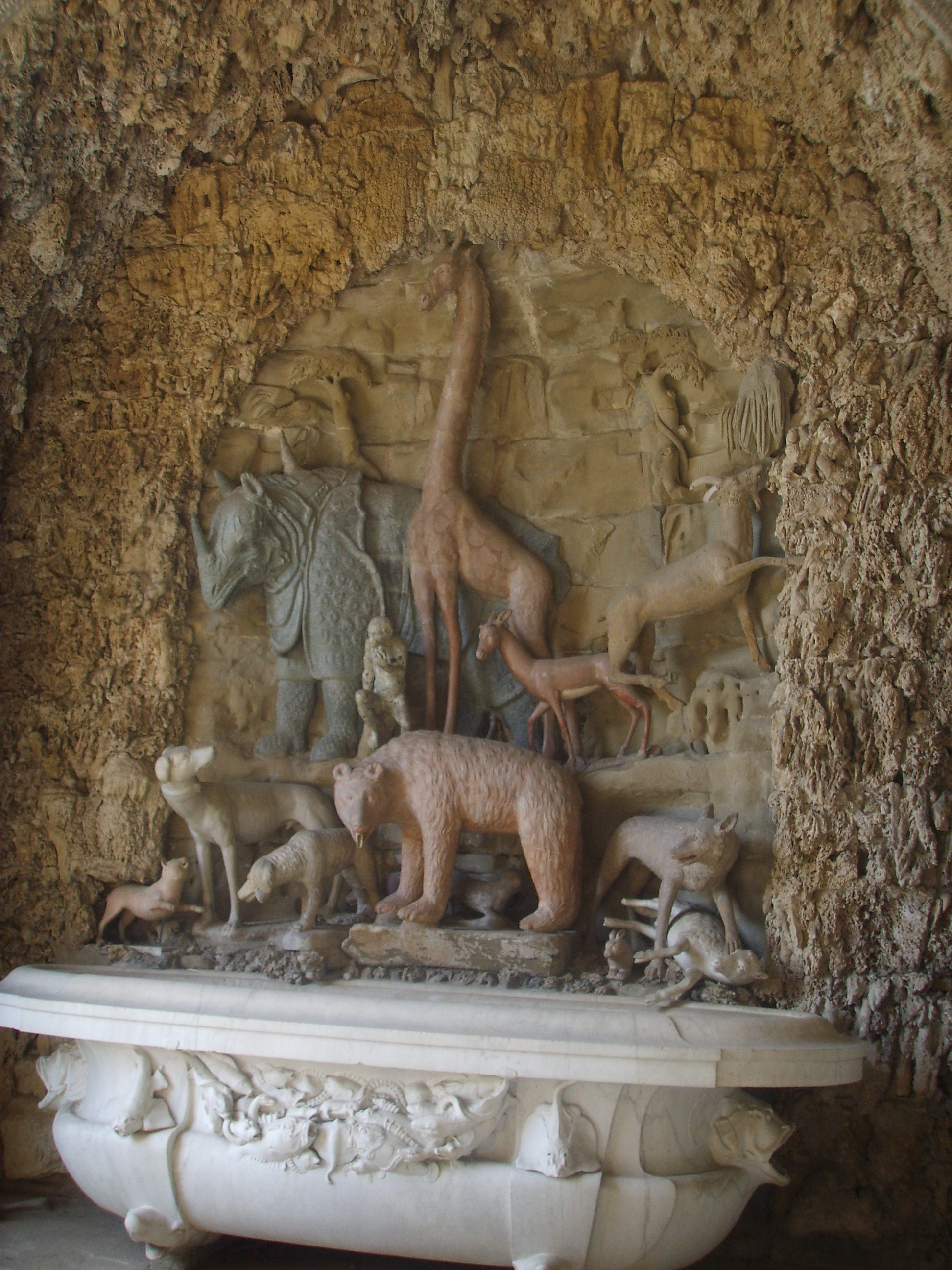
The left chamber of the grotto.

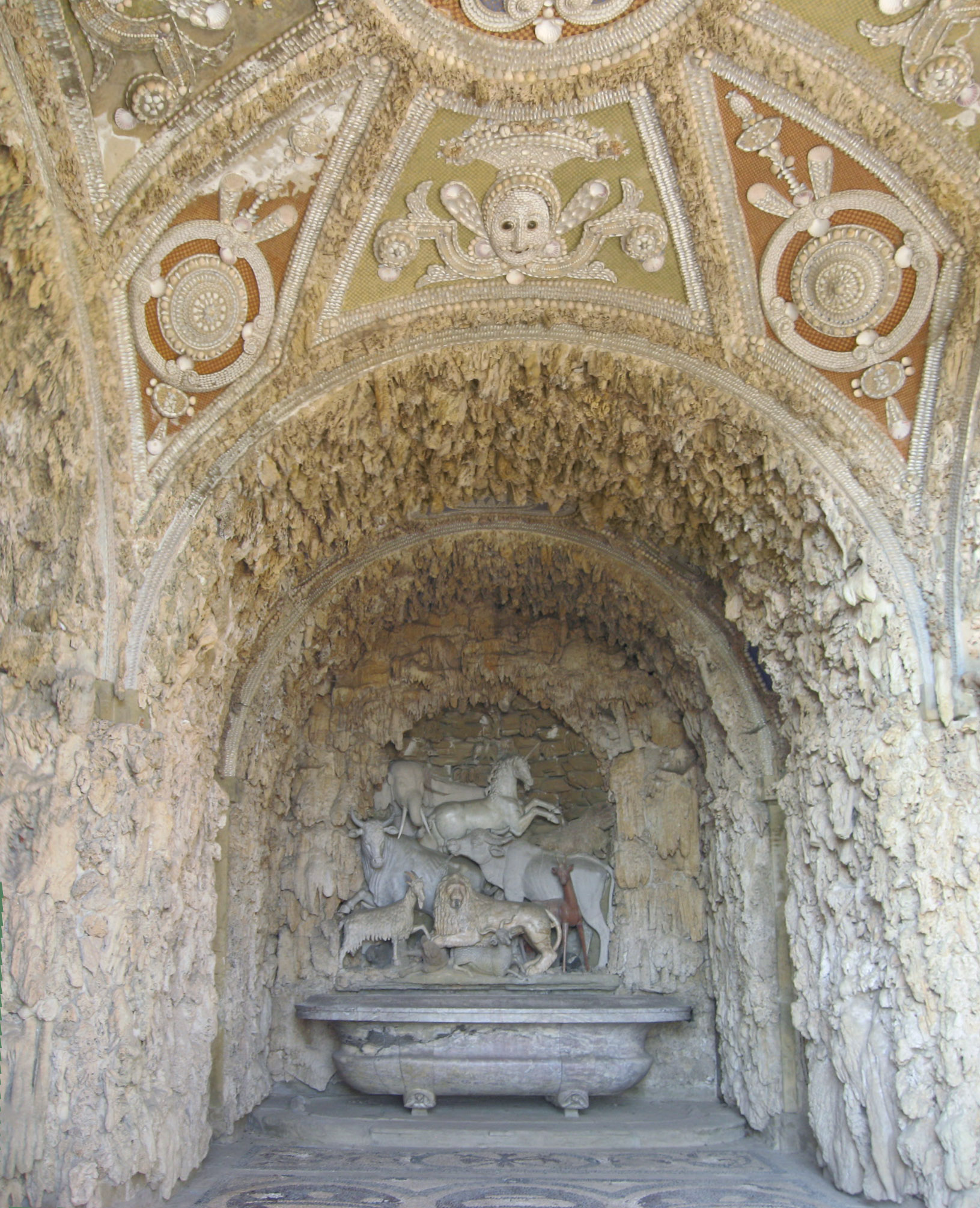
The ceiling of the grotto.

=== The citrus garden ===
The Villa was especially famous for its collection of dwarf citrus trees, especially lemon trees, which were grown in large wooden tubs, and put under shelter in the winter. The cultivation of citrus trees in Europe had begun in the mid-15th century, and was carried out on a large scale at Villa di Castello. Collections of citrus trees, later housed inside heated greenhouses called orangeries or lemon houses, became a feature of palaces around Europe.

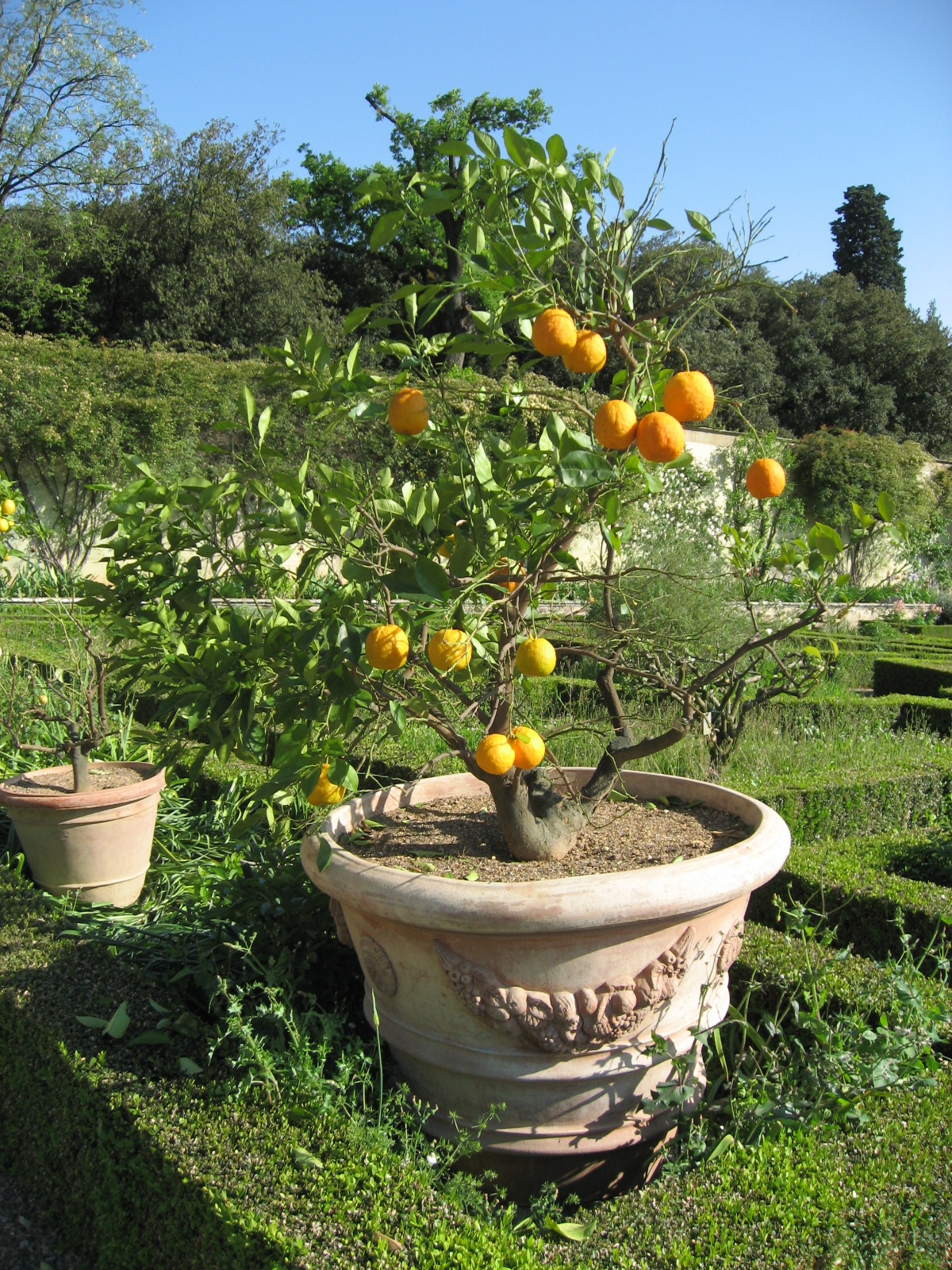
Dwarf citrus trees in pots are a traditional feature of the gardens of the Villa di Castello.

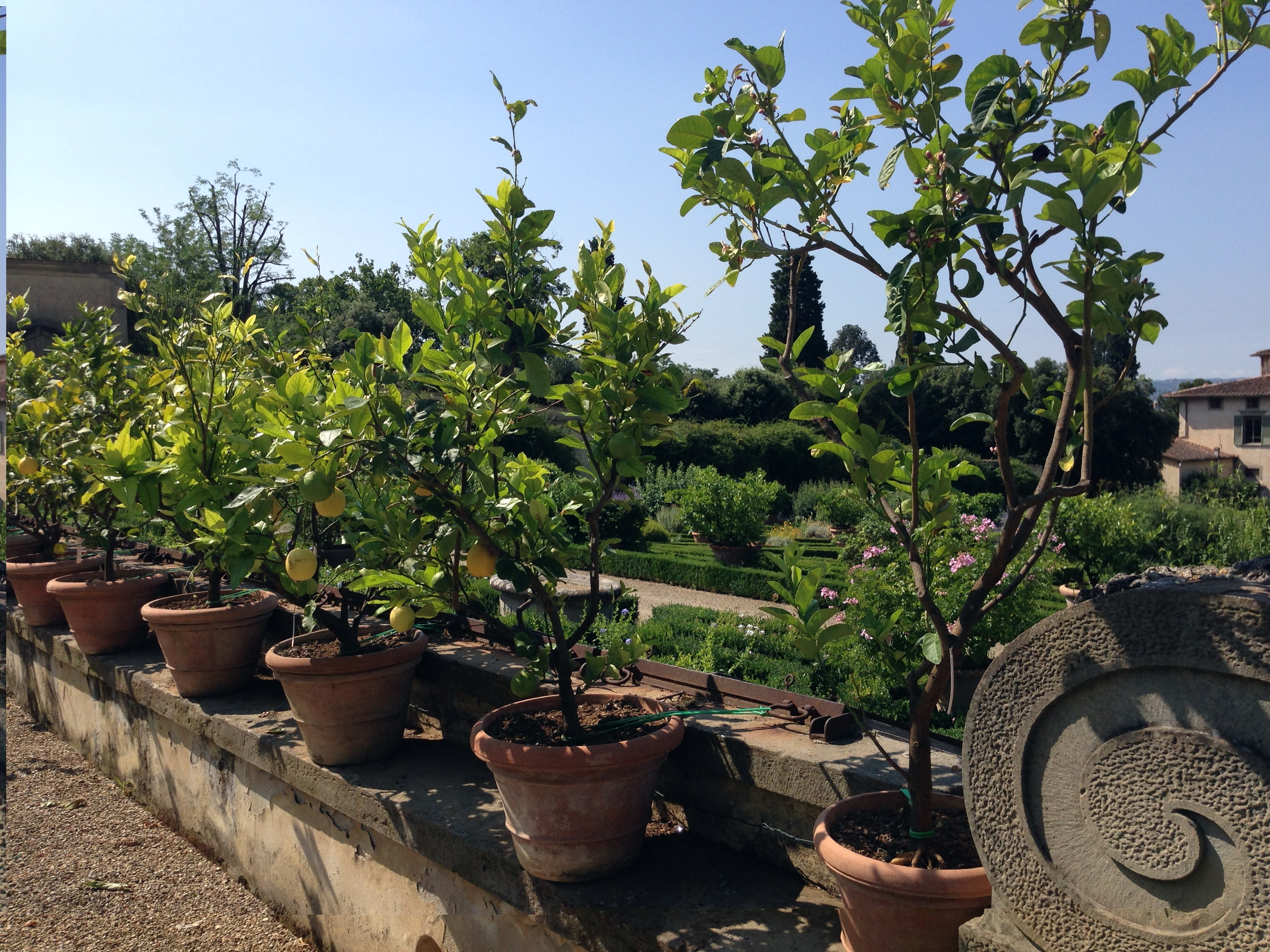
A row of dwarf lemon trees in the gardens of the Villa di Castello.

=== The ortaccio, or herb garden ===
The ortaccio is a separate walled garden east of the main garden, where aromatic and medicinal herbs were grown, along with exotic species of flowers. A 16th-century statue, representing either a rustic divinity or autumn, stands in the garden. It may have been one of the original figures in the larger garden when it was first created by Tribolo. Next to the ortaccio is a small classical-style hothouse, built in the late 18th century to house exotic flowers, particularly the rare double jasmine from Goa, in India, which Cosimo III de'Medici introduced to Florence in 1688. This flower was known as the Mugherino of the Grand Duke of Tuscany, and the house was called the Stufa di mugherini, or the stove of the mugherini.

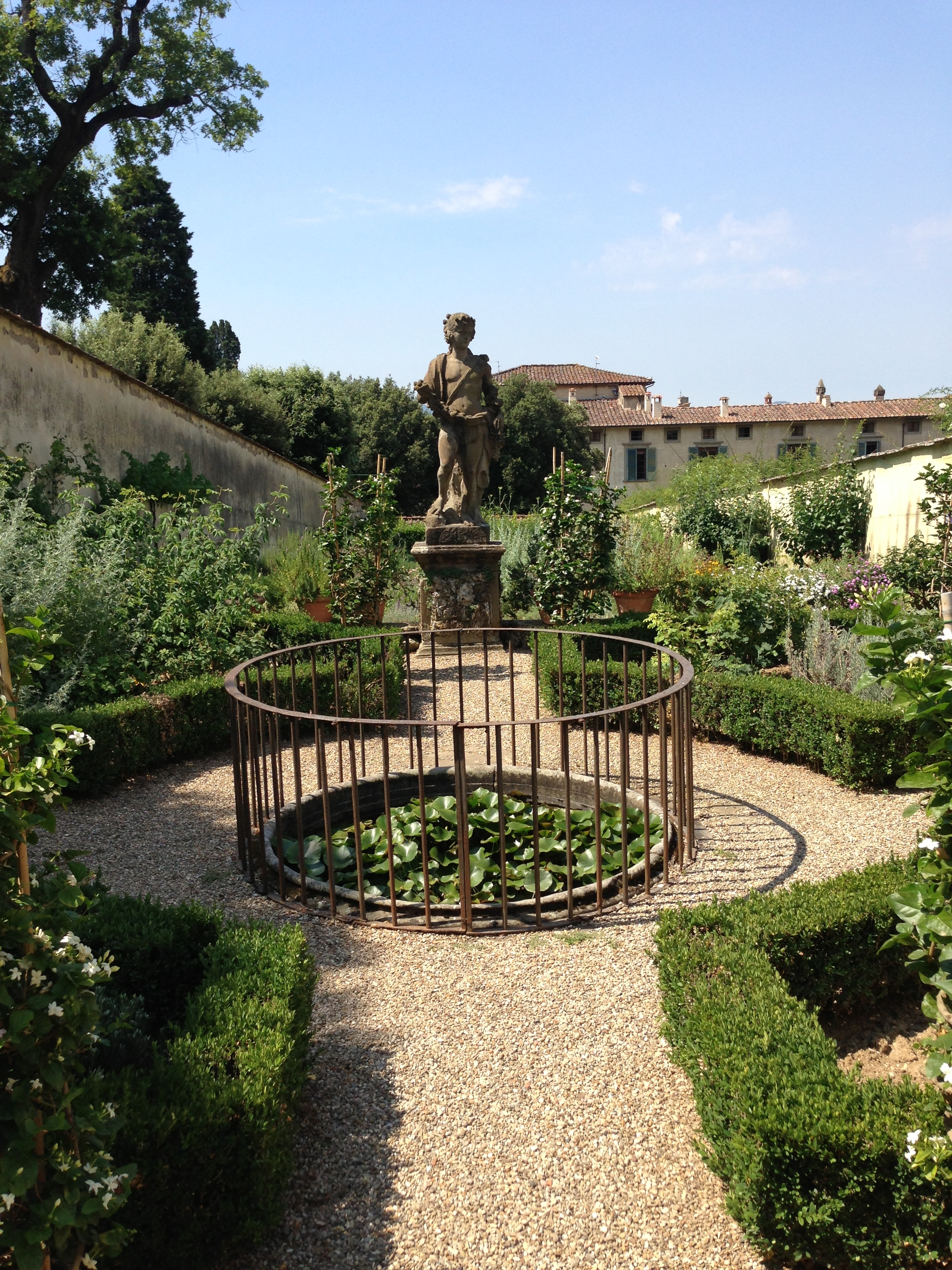
The ortaccio is a separate enclosed garden where medicinal plants, herbs and exotic plants were grown.

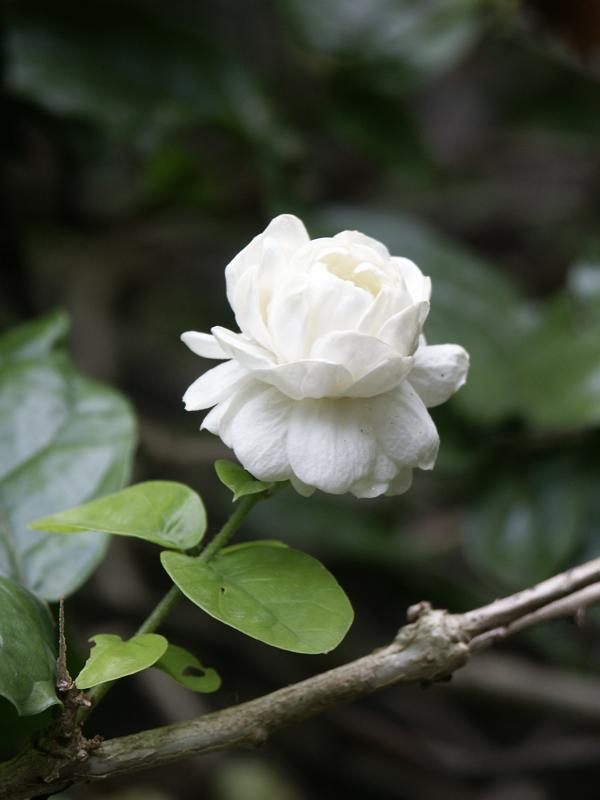
The Jasminum sambac, or Grand Duke of Tuscany, is a variety of jasmine first introduced to the garden in 1688 by Cosimo III de'Medici.

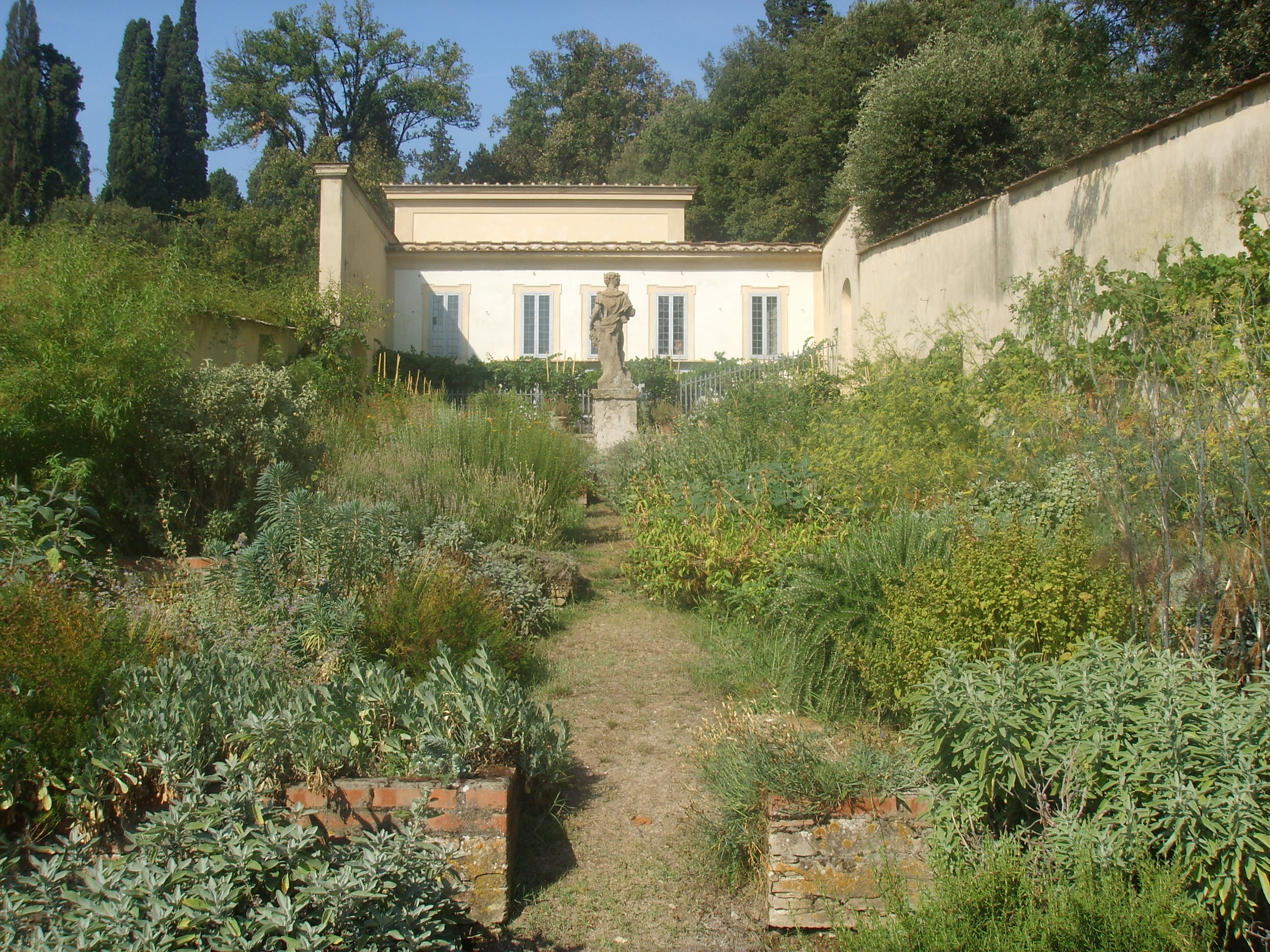
The hot-house called the Stufa di mugherini, at the end of the ortaccio, was built in the 18th century to nurture exotic flowers such as the jasminum sambac.

=== The Villa ===
The villa is today approached by an alley five hundred meters long shaded by trees, as it was in the time of Cosimo. During the life of Cosimo, the house was famous for its works of art, particularly the Botticelli Birth of Venus and Primavera, which were located there before 1550, and later moved to the Uffizi. It also included a cycle of paintings by Pontormo made in the loggia between 1538 and 1543, depicting the Return of the Golden Age, no longer existing.

The house, in its present state, is remarkable mainly for its plainness. The facade has no decoration, and the interior has been remodeled extensively for use as a barracks and a hospital. It now is the headquarters of the Accademia della Crusta and the Opera del Vocabalario Italiano, two associations devoted to the Italian language and literature.

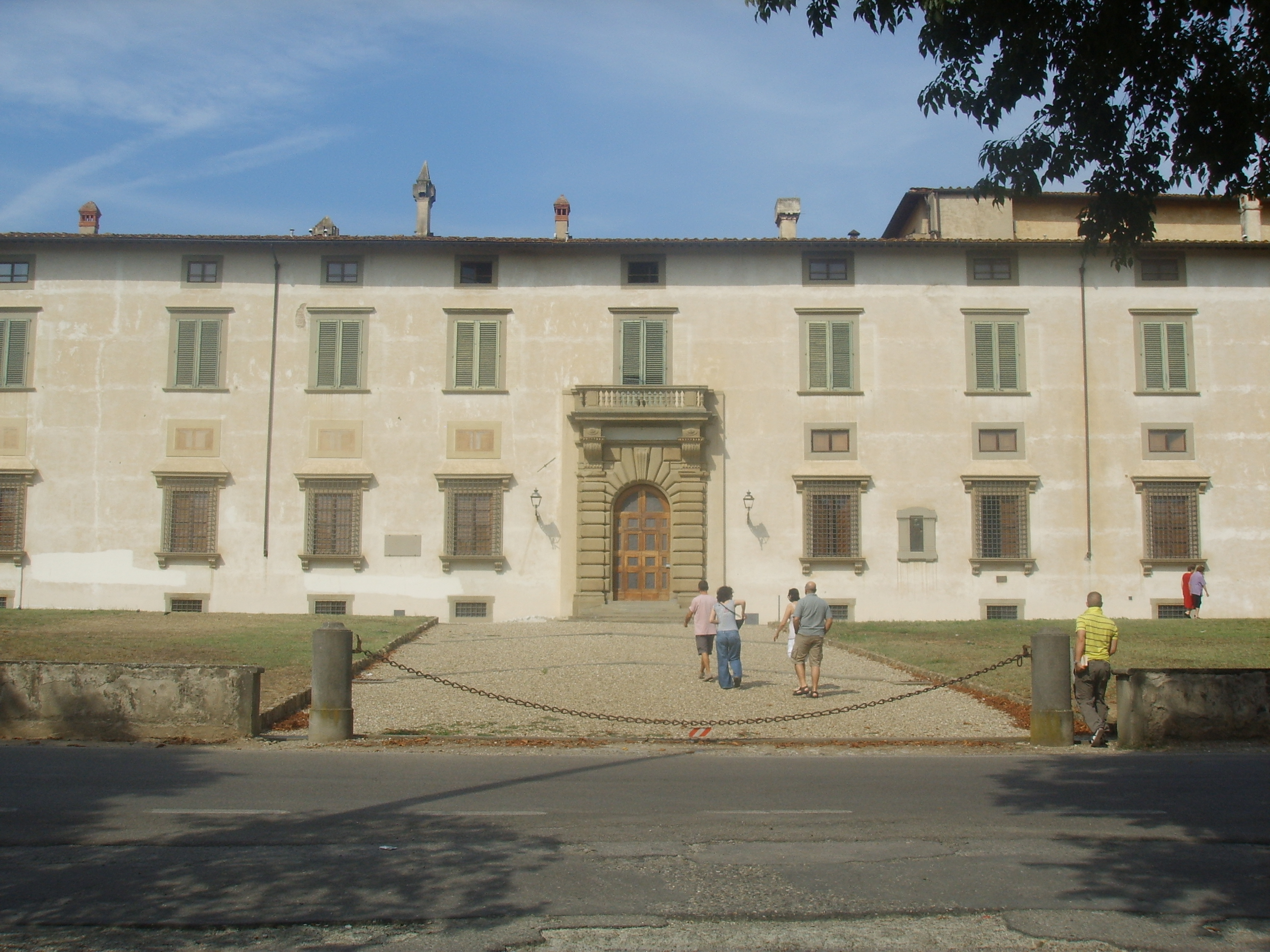
The exterior of the villa, from the south

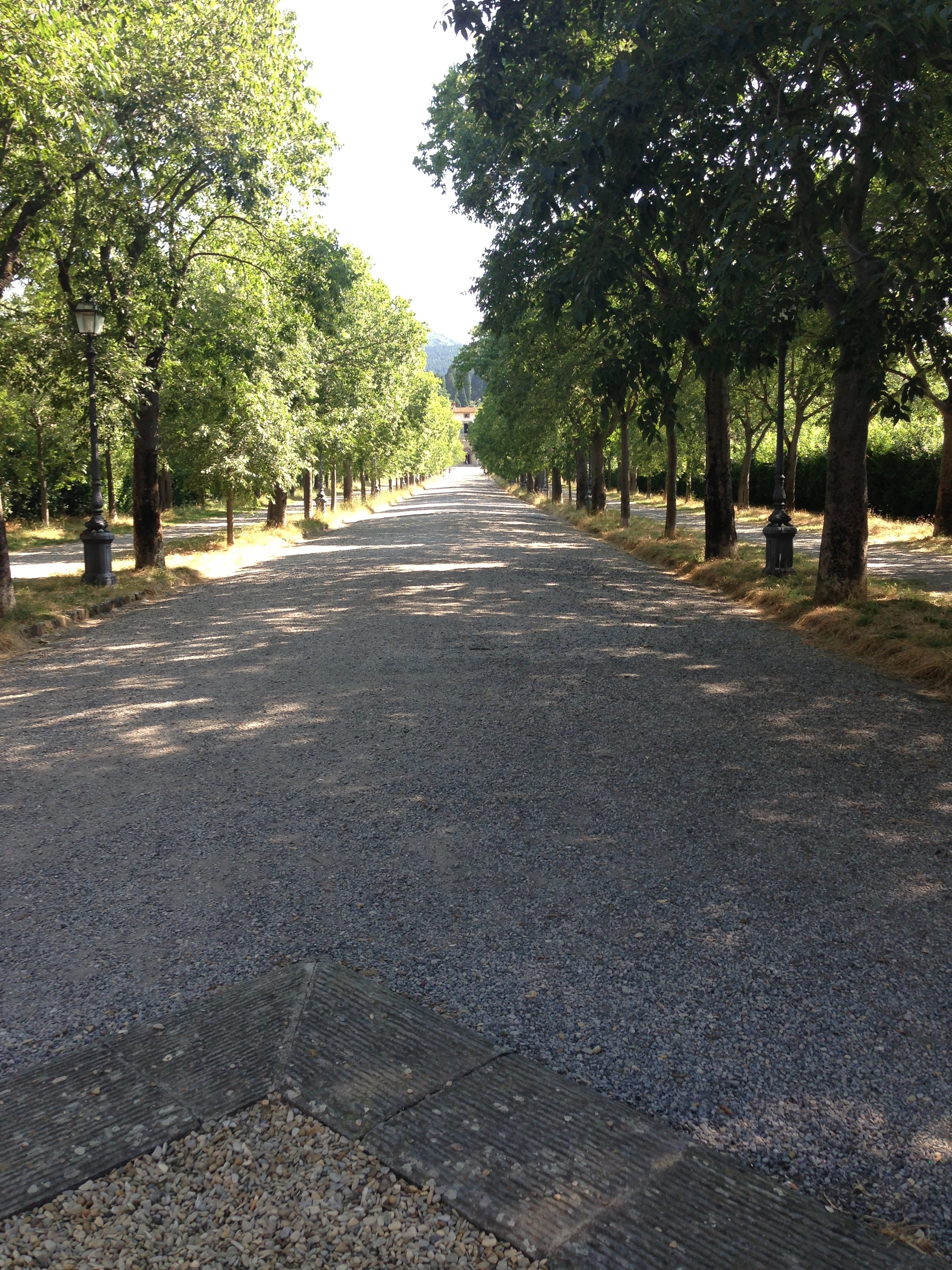
A five hundred meter avenue lined with trees leads to the front door of the Villa.

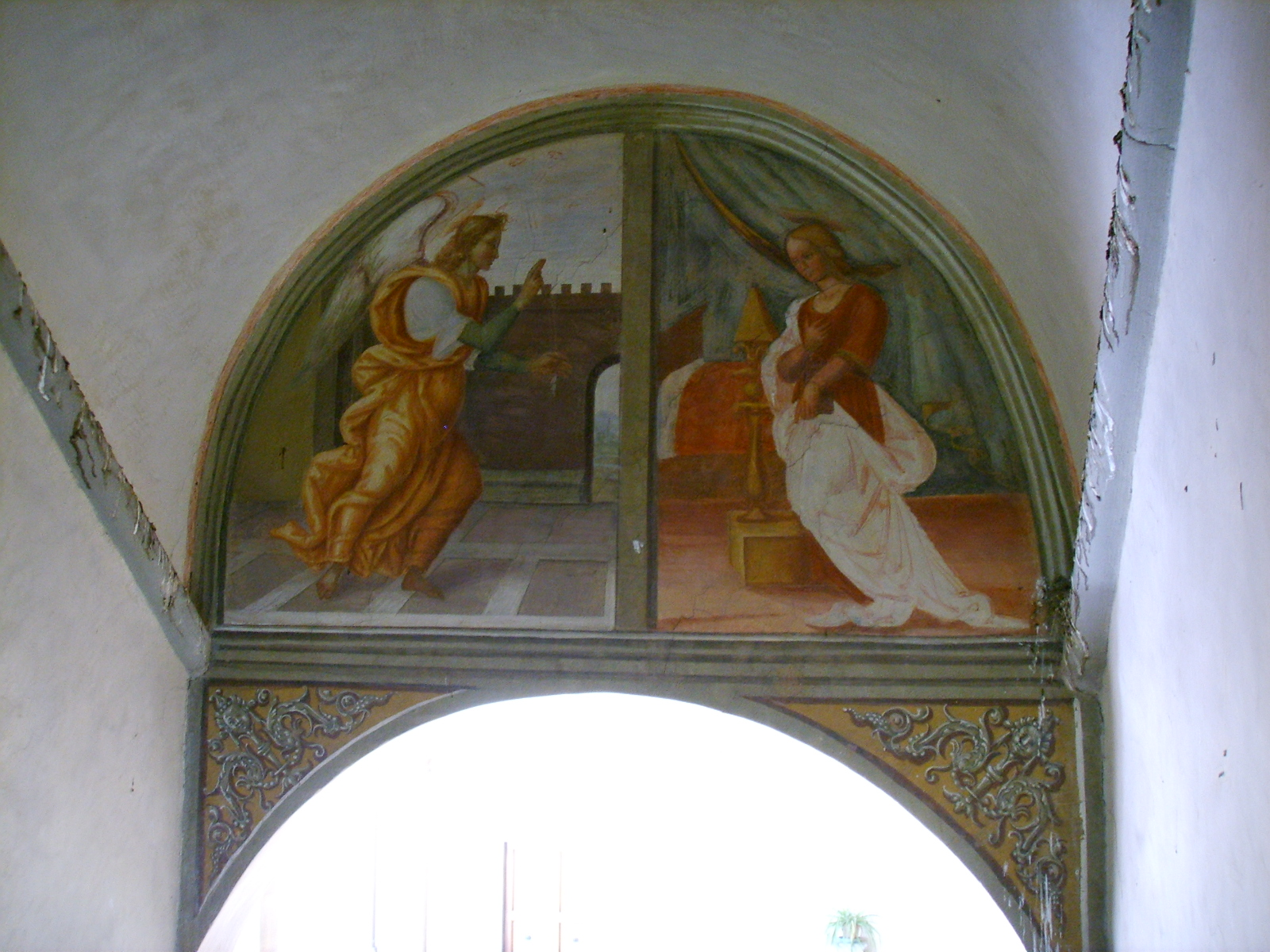
The Annunciation by Raffaellino del Garbo (1476-1524), in the interior of the villa, dates from before Cosimo's rise to power.

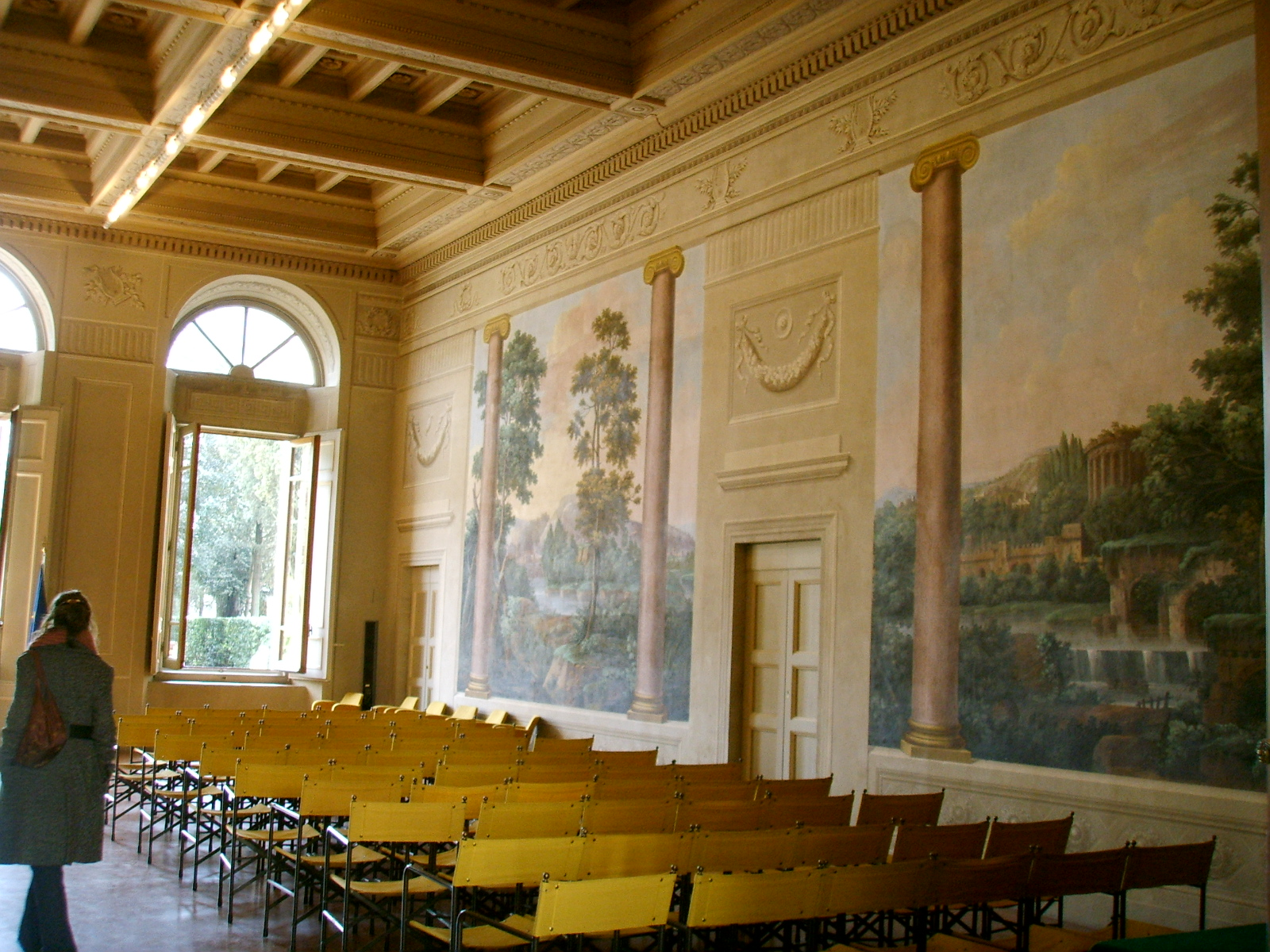
Murals in the salone delle riunioni, or meeting hall (19th century).

== The influence of Villa di Castello ==
The gardens of Villa di Castello had a profound influence on the Italian Renaissance garden and later on the French Renaissance garden and on the French formal garden. In Italy, Niccolò Tribolo copied several of the features of the Villa di Castello, including a grotto, fountains, and a series of monumental stairways in his plans for the Boboli Gardens in Florence. Tribolo also designed the botanical garden in Florence, the third in the world, on a similar geometric pattern, organized around a central fountain.

Villa di Castello also strongly influenced the later Medici villas, such as the Villa di Pratolino, constructed by Francesco I de' Medici, Grand Duke of Tuscany between 1569 and 1581. These gardens, like Villa di Castello, were built on a hillside, and featured a statue of Appennino, this one by Giambologna, multiple grottos, fountains, and hidden water jets to drench visitors. Unfortunately they were largely destroyed in 1820.

The Italian style was already known in France before Villa di Castello; King Francis I had commissioned Tribolo to make a statue for a garden fountain he built for his chateau at Fontainbleau, but the popularity of Italian gardens greatly increased after Cosimo built Villa di Castello. The first grotto in France was built at Fontainbleau in 1541.

The Italian garden style was promoted with great energy by two relations of Cosimo: Catherine de'Medici (1519-1589), the wife of King Henry II of France, and Marie De'Medici (1575-1642), the wife of King Henry IV of France. After Catherine became Regent in 1560, she began to build a new palace and the Tuileries Garden in the Italian style. The new garden, finished in 1564, featured a grotto with animals and figures made of pottery, a labyrinth, and flowerbeds laid along a central axis in geometric patterns.

Marie De'Medici, who had been born in the Pitti Palace next to the Boboli Gardens, built a replica of the Pitti Palace, called the Luxembourg Palace, and the Luxembourg Garden surrounding it in the Italian style. She imported a family of skilled fountain-makers from Florence, led by Tommaso Francini, to build the Medici Fountain, with its grotto. Several generations of Francinis created fountains for French gardens and palaces until the end of the 18th century.

The influence of the Villa di Castello could be seen in the Baroque gardens of the 17th and 18th centuries; the fountains of the Gardens of Versailles, with their statues illustrating the power and majesty of Louis XIV, and the water games in the gardens of Peterhof Palace in St. Petersburg, built by Peter the Great, echoed the garden of Cosimo De'Medici.

== See also ==
- Medici villas

== Notes and references ==
=== Bibliography ===
- Ballerini, Isabella. (2003). The Medici Villas: The Complete Guide. Florence: Giunti. ISBN 978-88-09-02995-8.
- Attlee, Helena (2006). Italian Gardens - A Cultural History (paperback). London: Frances Lincoln. pp. 240 pages. ISBN 978-0-7112-3392-8.
- Pozzana, Mariachiara (2011). The Gardens of Florence and Tuscany- Complete Guide (paperback). Florence: Giunti. ISBN 978-88-09-75952-7.
- Sophie Bajard; Rafaello Bencini (1992). Villas et jardins de Toscane. Paris: Terrail. ISBN 978-2-87939-057-4.
- Impelluso, Lucia (2007). Jardins, potagers et labyrinthes. Paris: Editions Hazan.
- Allain, Yves-Marie & Christiany, Janine (2006). L'art des jardins en Europe. Paris: Citadelles and Mazenod.
- Jacquin, Emmanuel, Les Tuileries, Du Louvre à la Concorde, Editions du Patrimoine, Centres des Monuments Nationaux, Paris (ISBN 978-2-85822-296-4)
- Giorgio Vasari, Lives of the Most Eminent Painters, Sculptors and Architects, Translated by Gaston Du C. De Vere, Gutenberg online edition
