= Niccolò Tribolo =

Italian sculptor

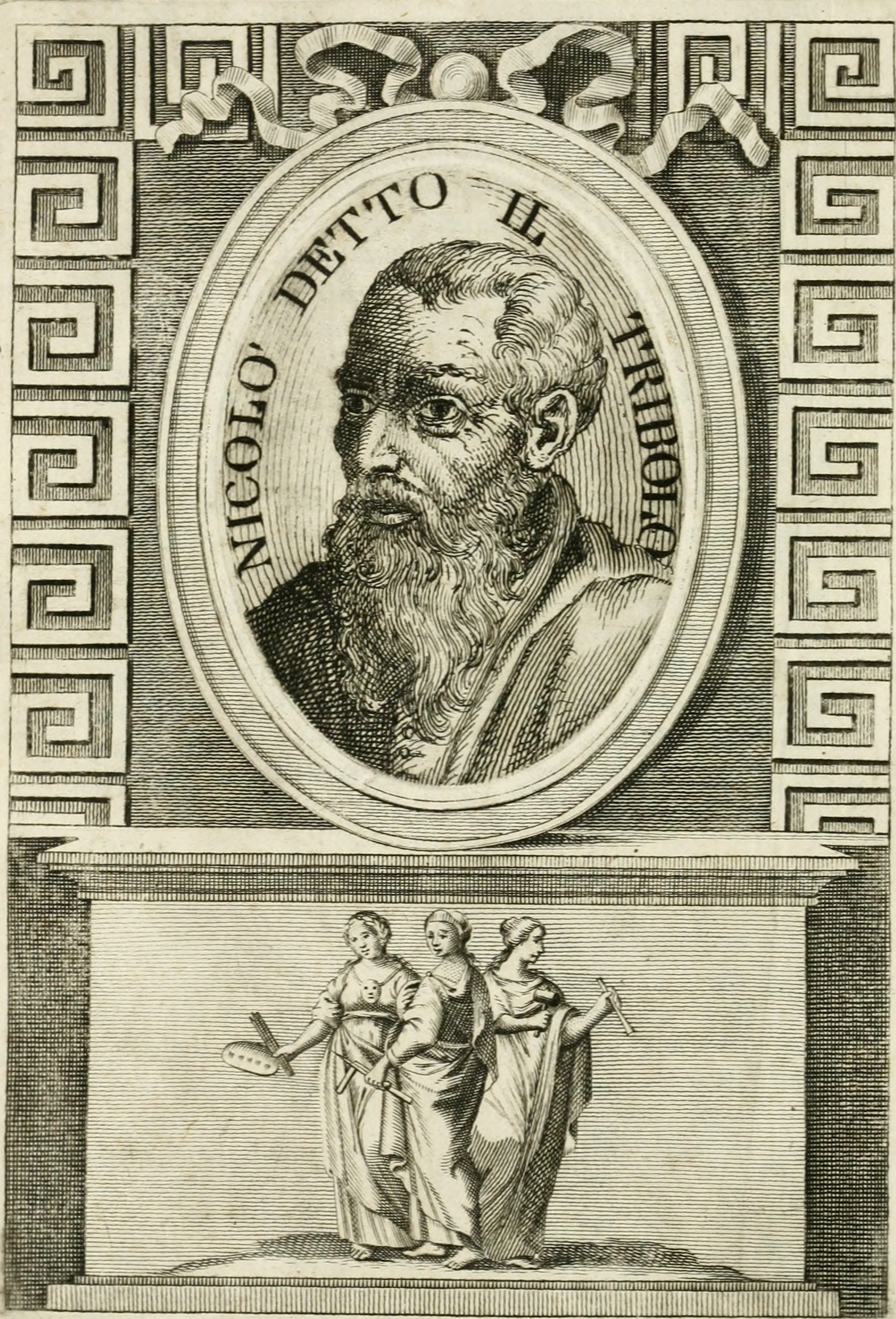
Image of Niccolò Tribolo

Niccolò di Raffaello di Niccolò dei Pericoli, called "Il Tribolo" (1500 – 7 September 1550) was an Italian Mannerist artist in the service of Cosimo I de' Medici in his natal city of Florence.

== Life ==
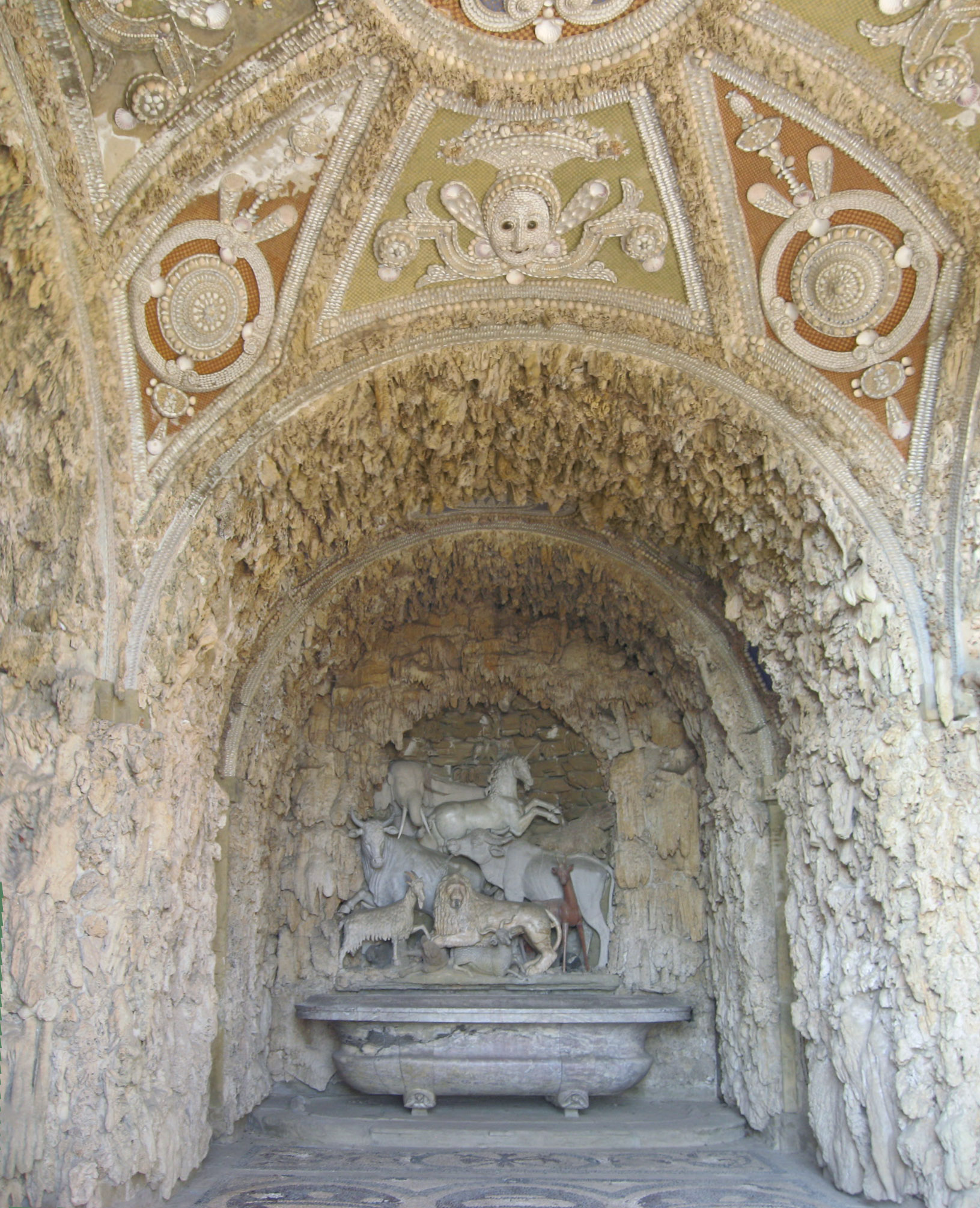
Grotto of animals by Giambologna in the Villa di Castello, Florence

Niccolò di Raffaello began as an apprentice to a woodcarver but, while still in his teens, was taken up as an assistant by Andrea Sansovino. Giorgio Vasari, in his Vite, mentioned numerous early figures and fountains by Tribolo that can no longer be traced.

A court artist like his successor Bernardo Buontalenti, he was expected to function well as a member of a team; like Buontalenti's, his name has been overshadowed by greater personalities. For example, in the 17th and 18th centuries, connoisseurs attributed to Michelangelo some of Tribolo's drawings for sculptural niches and wall fountains, a tribute to Tribolo's bravura as a draughtsman and a sign of Michelangelo's influence on his style.

From 1517 he had returned from Venice to Florence, working on his own. In his autobiography, Benvenuto Cellini tells of his trip to Venice with "Tribolino" for whose son he had stood as godfather. In Bologna, where they saw some Florentine exiles at an inn, the cautious Tribolo, "the most timorous man that I have ever known, kept on saying: 'Do not look at them or talk to them, if you care to go back to Florence'" In Venice, after several days' journey, it soon appeared that Jacopo Sansovino had no present work for Niccolò, but invited him to drop in again, at his convenience.

Vasari tells of the painter Giuliano Bugiardini who had been at a loss to draw a file of figures and "foreshorten them so that they should appear all in a row, or how he could find room for them in so narrow a place. Buonarroti, feeling compassion for the poor man, took up a piece of charcoal and sketched a file of naked figures with all the judgment and excellence proper to him, and went away with many thanks from Giuliano. Not long after, the latter brought Il Tribolo his friend to see what Buonarroti had done, and told him all about it; but because Buonarroti had only sketched them in outline, without any shadow, Bugiardini could not carry them out; so Il Tribolo resolved to help him, and he made some rough models in clay, giving them all that rough force which Michelangelo had put into the drawing; and so he brought them to Giuliano. But this manner did not please Bugiardini's smooth fancy, and as soon as Il Tribolo was gone he took a brush and, dipping it in water, smoothed them all down. Il Tribolo, hearing about it from Giuliano himself, laughed at his honest simplicity, and the work was at last finished, so that none would have known that Michael Angelo had ever looked at it."

Soon Tribolo was fully employed by Grand Duke Cosimo I de' Medici. Many of the lavish productions of 16th-century court artists were ephemeral, like the tableaux and triumphal arches Tribolo created for Charles V's grand entrance into Florence in 1536. Diplomatic errands were also required: on Cosimo's orders, Tribolo went to Rome to induce Michelangelo to return to Florence and take up his uncompleted stairs in the vestibule of the Laurentian Library. In more lasting projects, Tribolo contributed the architectural framework of the rich funeral chapel of Cosimo's consort Eleonora di Toledo, rebuilt the old Villa Medici at Poggio a Caiano, where he apparently designed the new stables, and in the last year of his life laid out the first axial development of the Boboli Gardens behind Palazzo Pitti, where he oversaw the construction of the amphitheatre before his premature death in 1550. In his gardens there and at the Medici villas La Petraia and Villa Castello, Tribolo is often credited with fathering the Italian garden— insofar as the phenomenon could have a single father.

== Villa di Castello ==
At his mother's villa, where he had spent his youth, the Villa di Castello at Rifredi near Florence, Grand Duke Cosimo entrusted Tribolo from 1536 with the layout of a garden that was to illustrate, with an elaborate iconological program worked out by one of Cosimo's court humanists, the beneficent influence of the recently ennobled Medici, seen to be watering Tuscany, as a source of water fertilizes a garden. With the aid of hydraulic engineer Piero da San Casciano, Tribolo engineered a sequence of terraces with fountains that began at the upper end in the "wild" garden— where the civilizing Medici touch had not yet been felt— with a sculpture of The Apennines (by Ammanati); once in the formal terraces the tamed water passed in linear canals to two sculptural fountains placed along the central axis. The marble bases of both were sculpted by Il Tribolo and his assistant Pierino da Vinci, 1538 –1548, but the bronze figures that formerly crowned them have been moved to Villa La Petraia: Hercules and Antaeus by Ammanati, and Florentia (Florence) as a classical Venus anadyomene ("Venus wringing out her hair") by Giambologna. The fountains were the earliest fully sculptural fountain complexes set at the centre of garden spaces, and they set the example for the seamless development of fountains as major settings for figure sculpture, in a sequence that extended unbroken into the early 20th century. Against a retaining wall at Villa Castello, Tribolo positioned a grotto on the central axis: it was completed under the direction of Giorgio Vasari with bronze birds from whose beaks water once spurted, sculpted by Giambologna and Ammanati (now in the Bargello). In 1581 Montaigne was so impressed with the copious giochi d'aqua at Castello that he included a description of the gardens in his travel journal.

== Minor works ==
- Ganymede riding the Eagle, bronze, Bargello, Florence.
- Doorway reliefs, (1525–27) Basilica di San Petronio, Bologna.
- Reliefs, Santa Casa in the Cathedral of Loreto, (1530–33), a project that had been begun under the direction of Sansovino in 1513.

A symposium on the occasion of Tribolo's cinquecentennial in 2000 was held at Poggio a Caiano, with contributions by several art historians .

The Bizzarria of Florence was rediscovered at the Villa Castello.

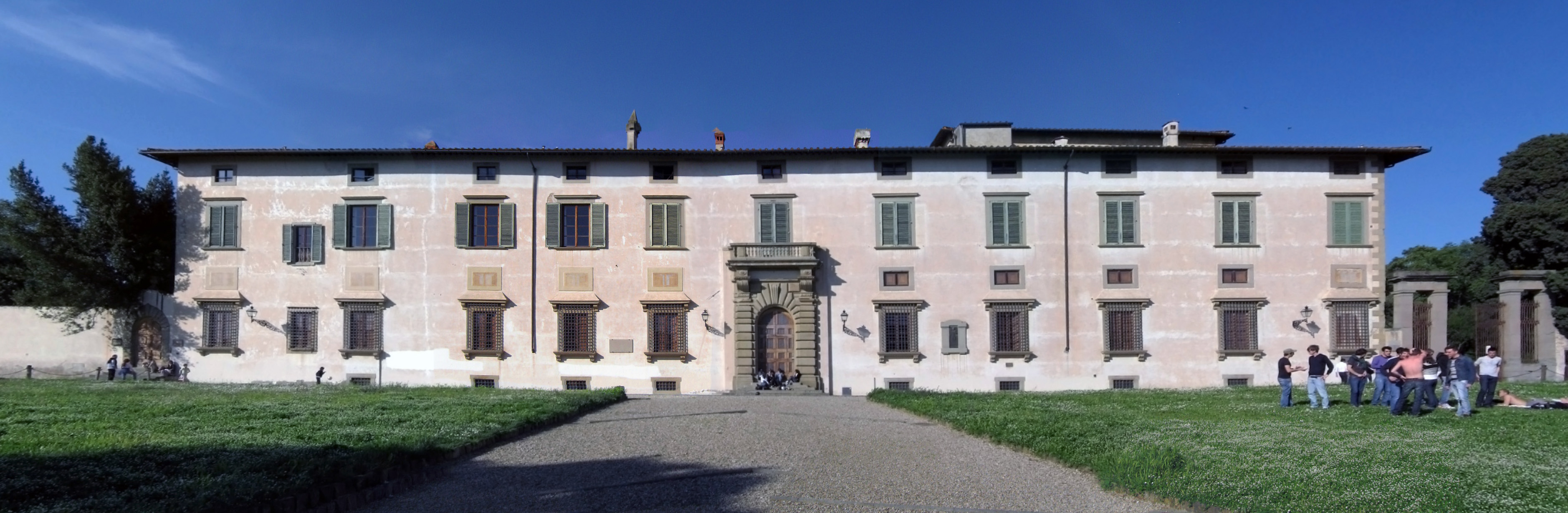
Exterior of the Villa di Castello in Florence
