= Villa La Petraia =

Historic estate in Florence, Italy

UNESCO World Heritage Site
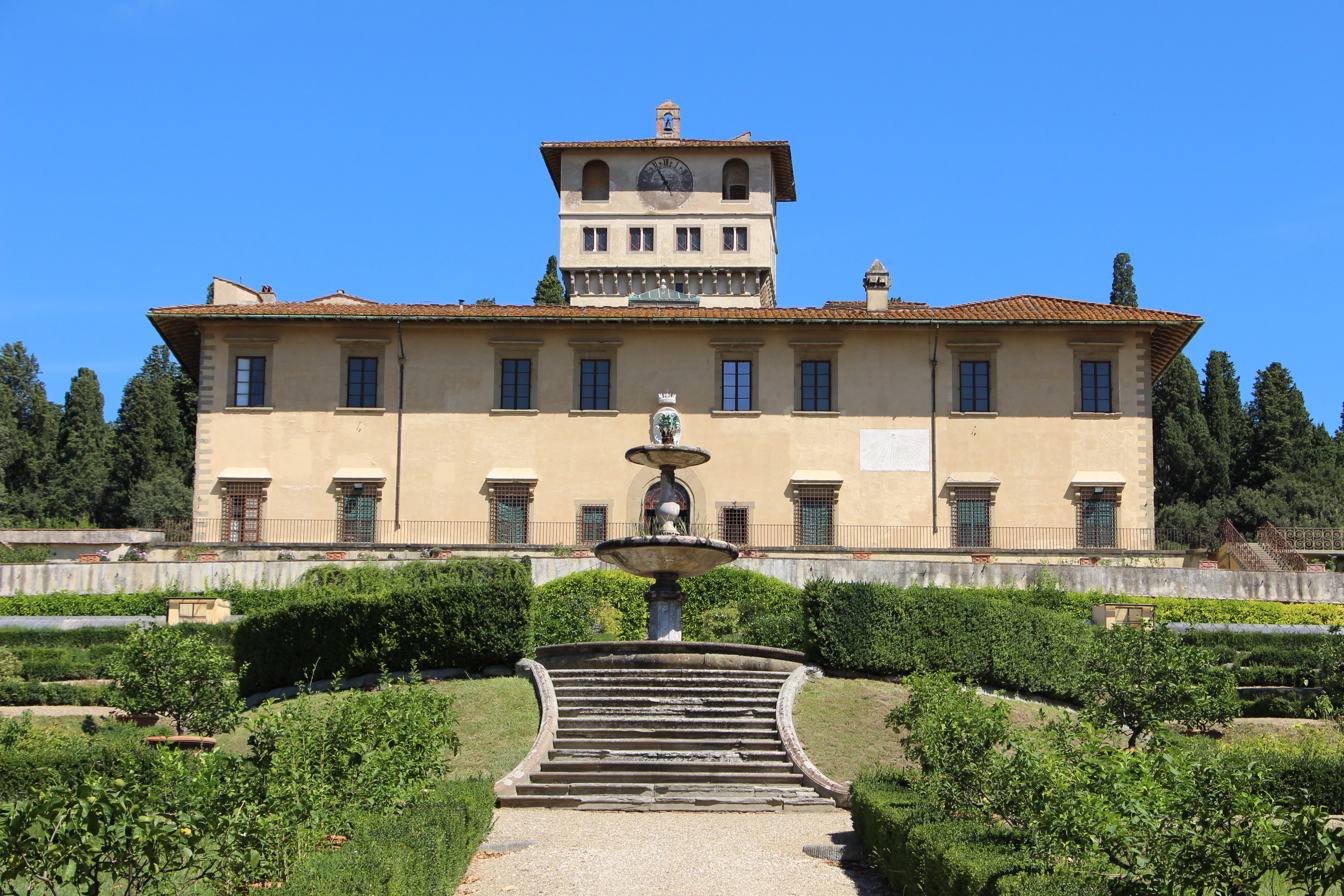

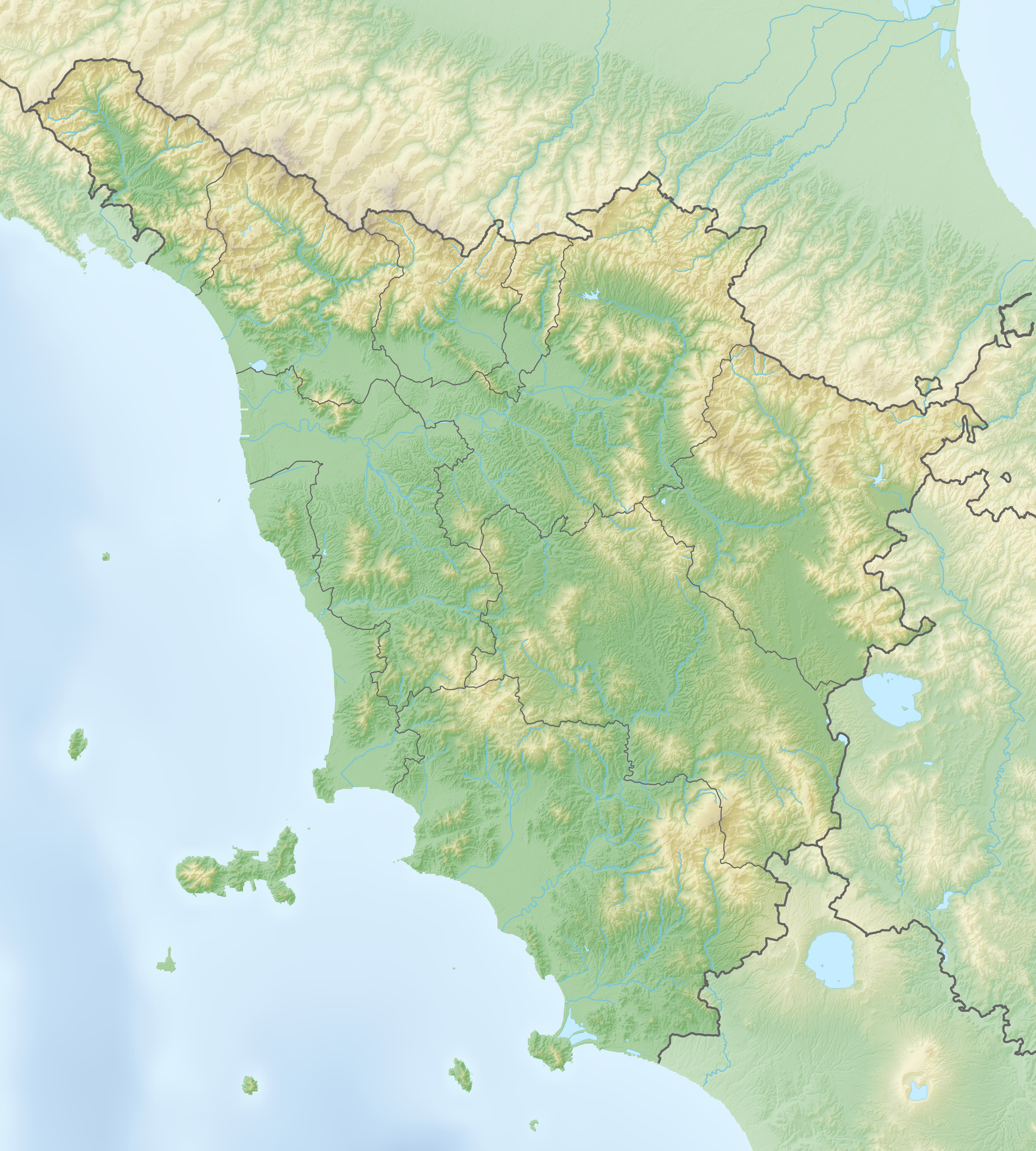
- Location within Tuscany Location within Italy
- Coordinates: 43°49′06″N 11°14′04″E

Villa La Petraia is one of the Medici villas in Castello, Florence, Tuscany, central Italy. It has a distinctive 19th-century belvedere on the upper east terrace on axis with the view of Florence.

== History ==
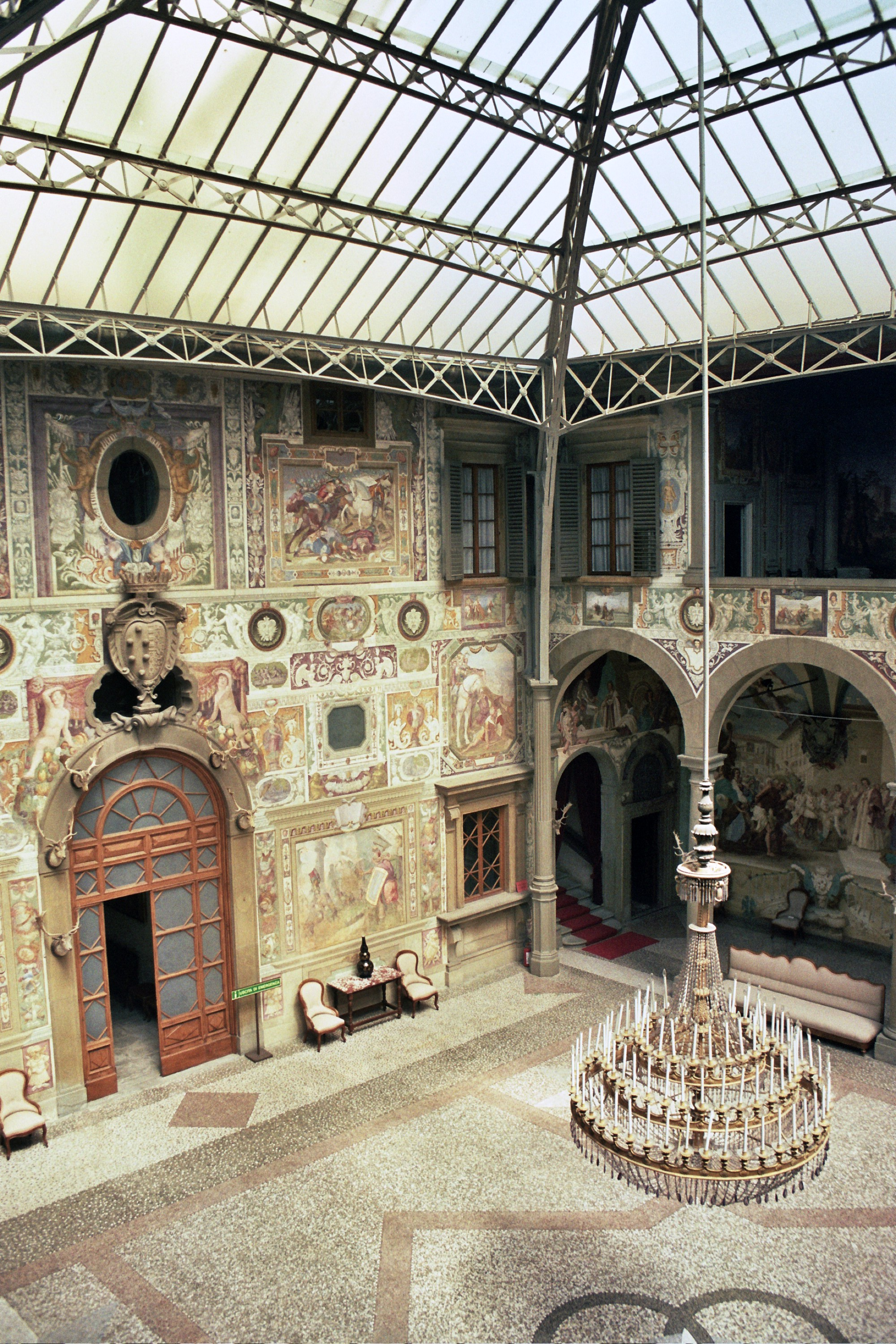
Villa La Petraia, inner court

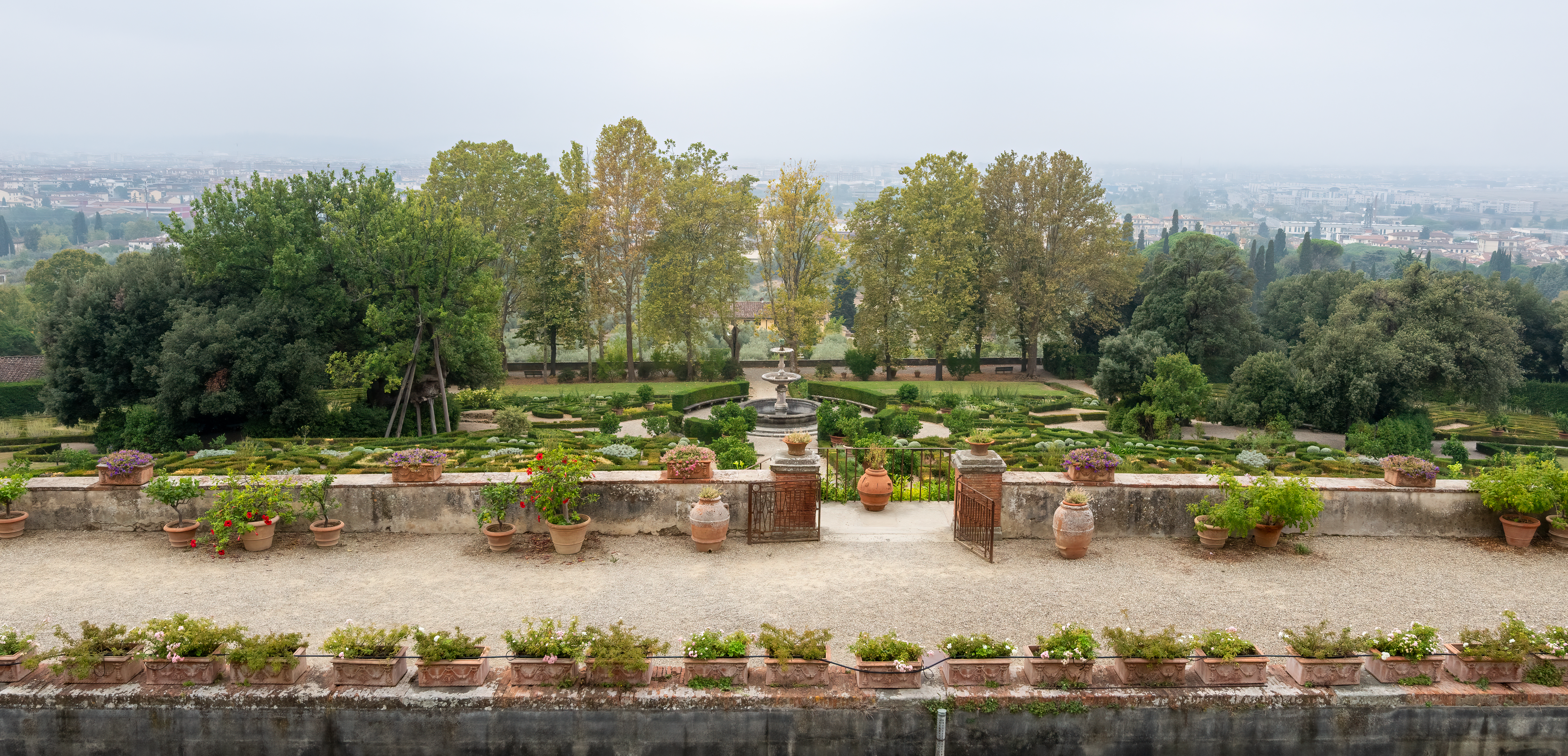
The Villa La Petraia garden

In 1364, the "palace" of Petraia belonged to the Brunelleschi family until in 1422 Palla Strozzi bought it and expanded it by buying the surrounding land.

In the first half of the sixteenth century, the villa became the property of the Salutati, who then sold the villa to Cosimo I de' Medici in 1544, who gave it to his son, Cardinal Ferdinando in 1568. Then from 1588, there was a decade of extensive excavation works which transformed the "stony" nature of the place (hence the name in Petraia, that is full of stones) into dramatic sequence of terraces dominated by the massive main building. It is traditionally attributed to Bernardo Buontalenti, even though the only documented certainty is the presence on site of Raphael Pagni.

The Villa remained in the ownership of the Medici family until their extinction, when it passed to the Grand Dukes of Habsburg-Lorraine. Leopold II laid out the Romantic style garden park to the north, but otherwise few changes were made. From 1860 the estate came into the ownership of the House of Savoy, becoming one of Victor Emmanuel II's favourite residences. During this time the central courtyard was given a glass roof and an aviary was constructed. The villa was transferred to the Italian state in 1919 and is now a museum.

== Giusto Utens paintings ==
In 2014 a new permanent gallery at Petraia Villa Medici was opened to display the 14 surviving paintings of Medici villas by Giusto Utens (previously held by the Museo di Firenze com'era).

== See also ==
- Medici villas
