= Giusto Utens =

Italian painter

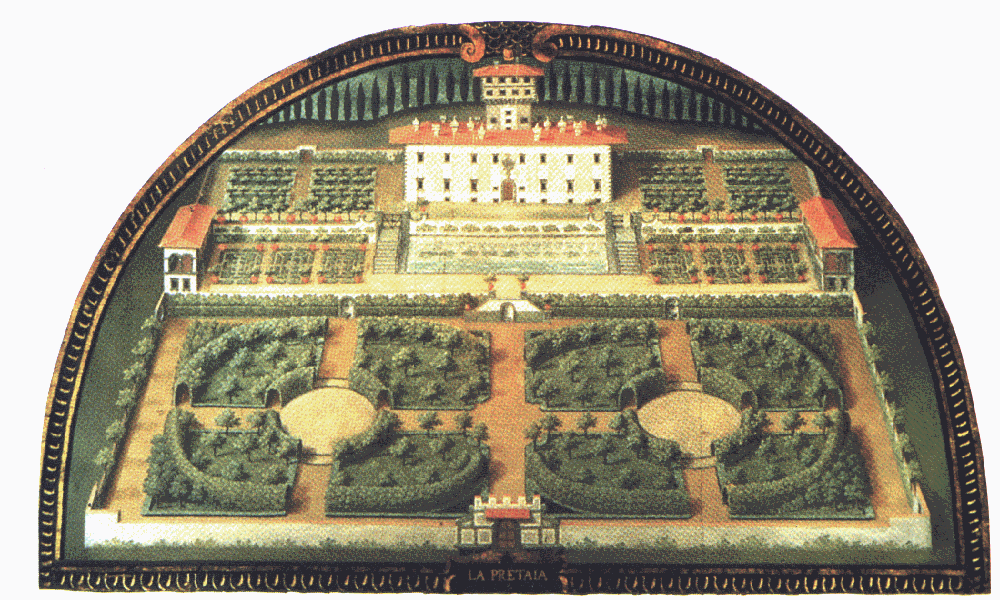
Villa La Petraia by Giusto Utens

Giusto Utens or Justus Utens (died 1609) was a Flemish painter who is remembered for the series of Medicean villas in lunette form that he painted for the third Grand Duke of Tuscany, Ferdinando I, in 1599–1602.

He moved to Carrara about 1580, where he married, and where later he returned and died.

== Medici villas ==
The Medici villas illustrated by Utens from a bird's-eye perspective are:

- Villa Medici del Trebbio
- Villa Medicea di Cafaggiolo
- Palazzo Pitti, the Boboli Gardens and Fort Belvedere
- Villa Medici di Castello
- Villa Medici La Petraia
- Villa di Pratolino
- Villa Medicea L'Ambrogiana
- Villa di Lappeggi
- Villa di Poggio a Caiano
- Villa di Serravezza
- Villa La Magia
- Villa Di Marignolle
- Villa di Montevettolini
- Villa di Colle Salvetti

The three missing lunettes are thought to be the Villa di Artimino and perhaps the Villa Medici di Careggi. In the early twentieth century an anonymous artist completed the scheme, based on eighteenth-century vedute illustrating the villa at Careggi, that at Cerreto Guidi and Villa del Poggio Imperiale, which in the sixteenth century was still the Villa di Poggio Baroncelli.

=== Location ===
Of the seventeen Utens paintings, fourteen have survived, and were displayed in the history museum of Florence, the Museo di Firenze com'era, until its closure in 2010. They were transferred in 2014 to a new permanent gallery at Petraia Villa Medici.

=== Lunettes of the Medicean villas ===
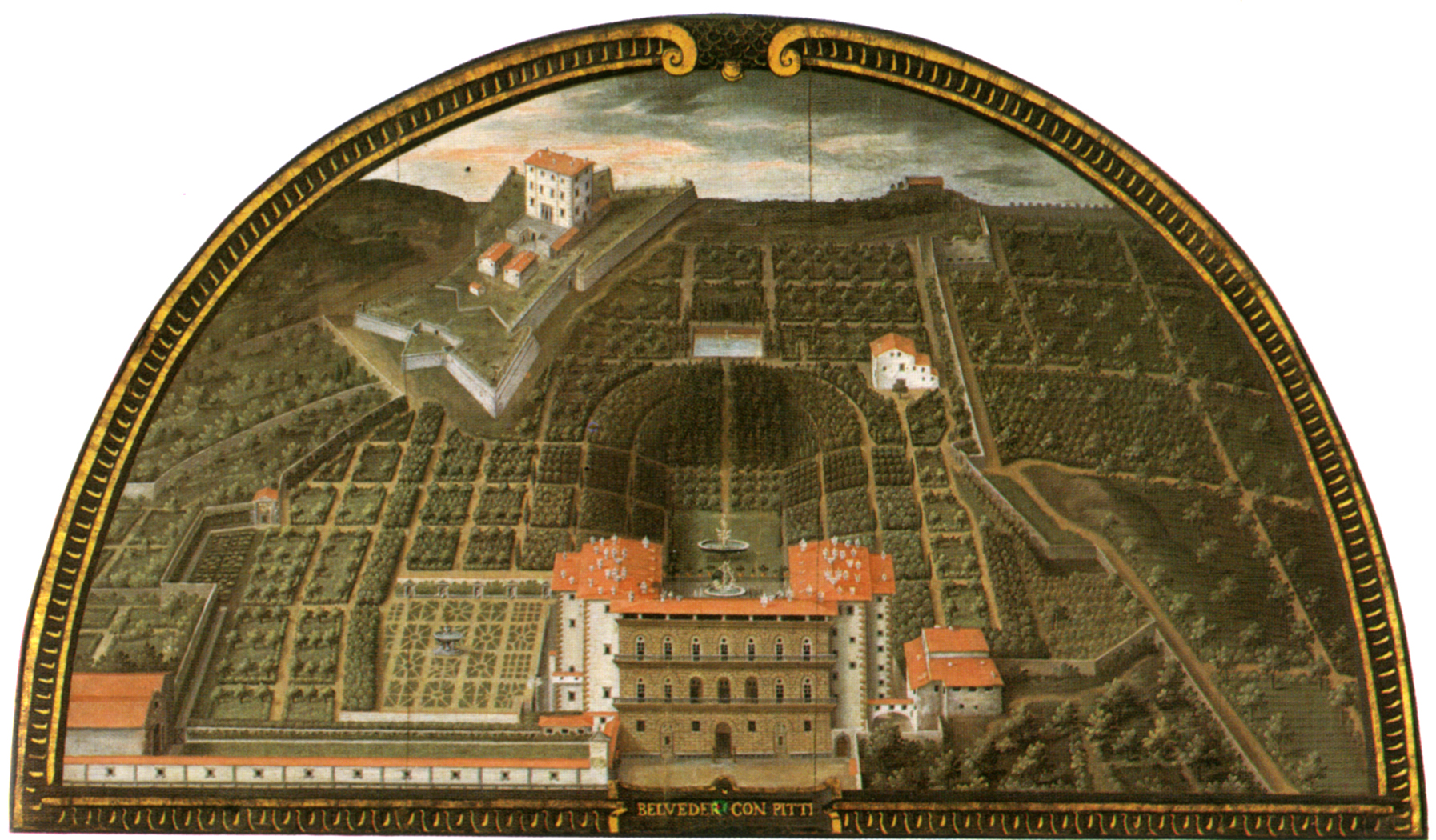
Pitti Palace and the Boboli Gardens

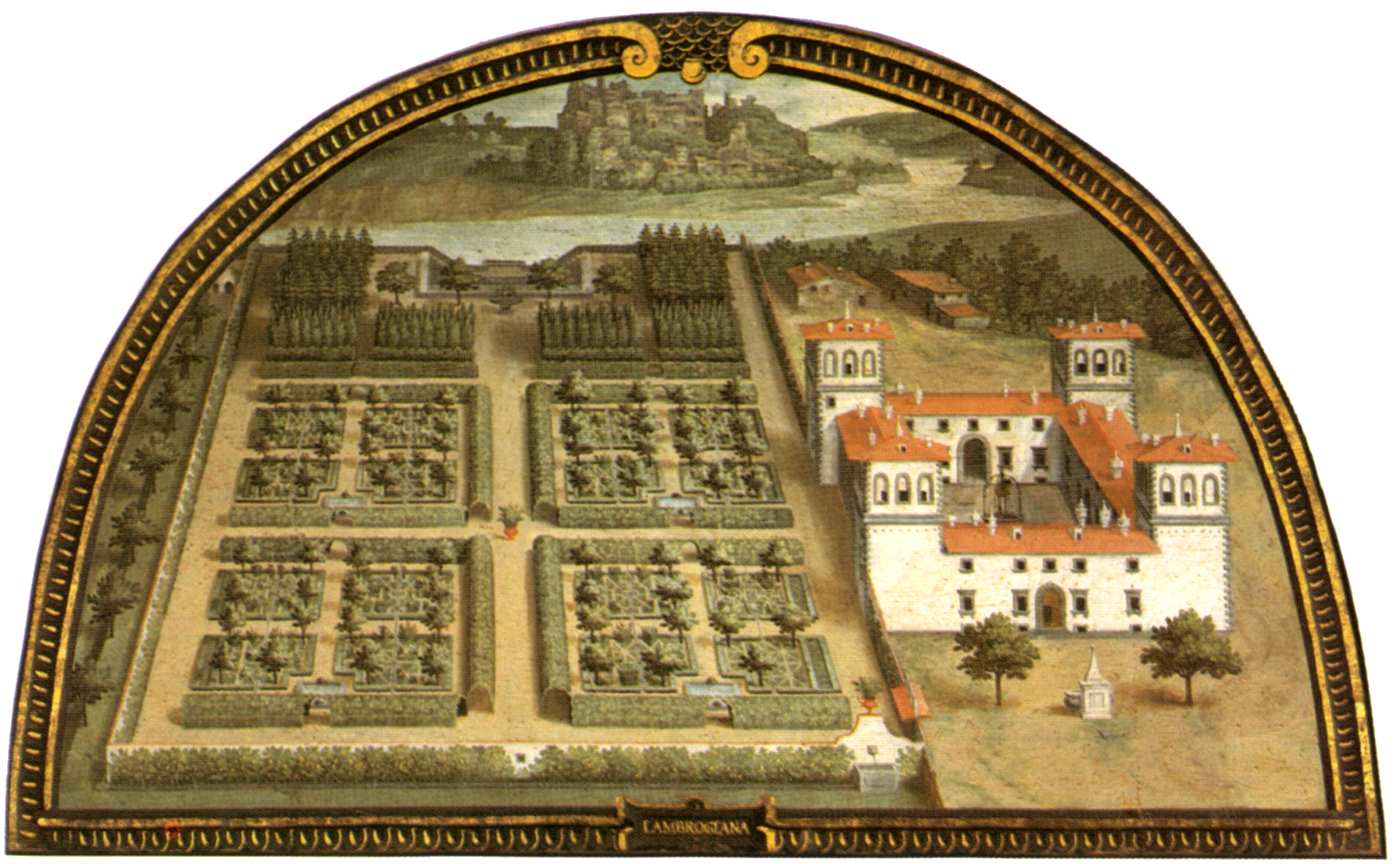
Villa Medicea L'Ambrogiana

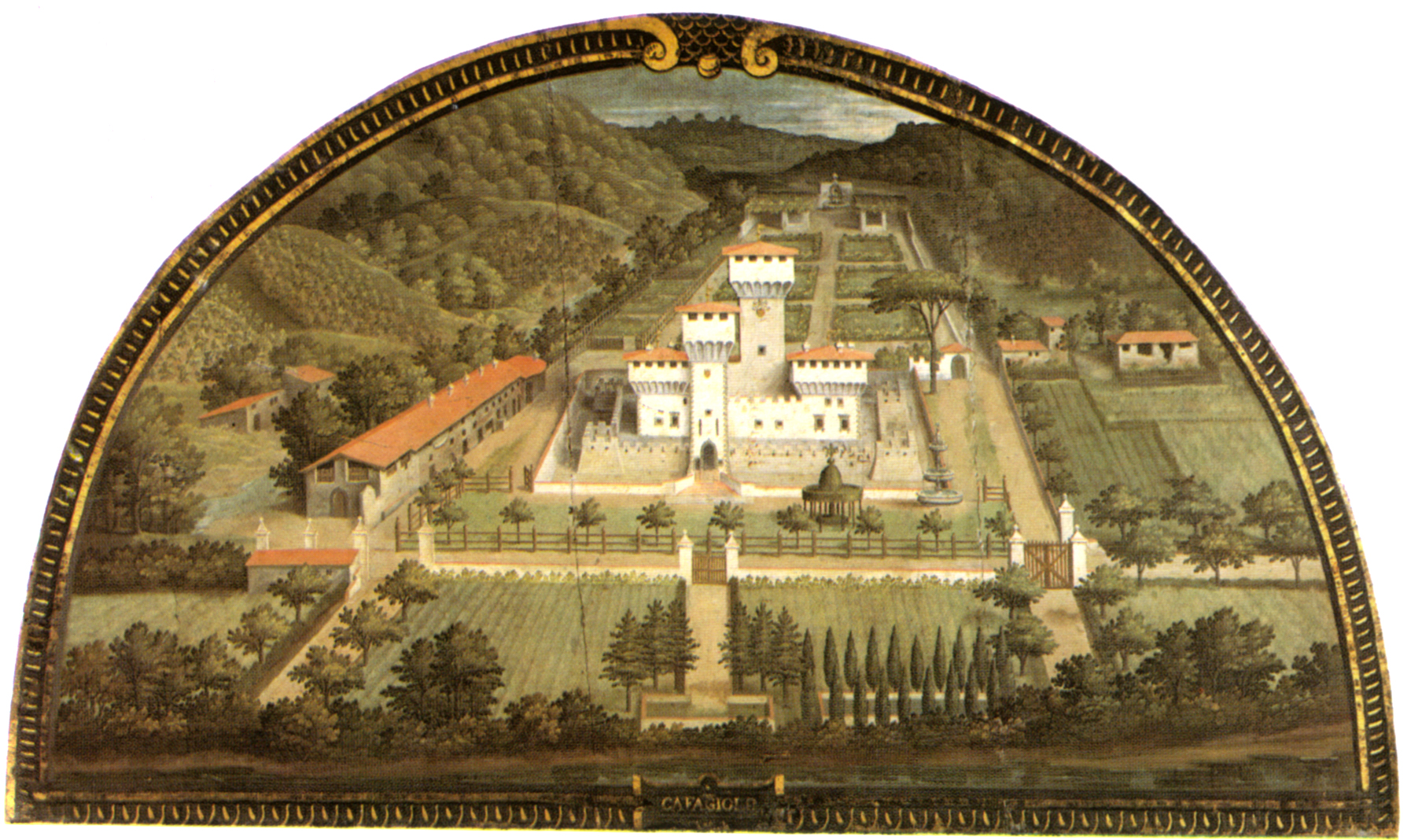
Villa Medici at Cafaggiolo

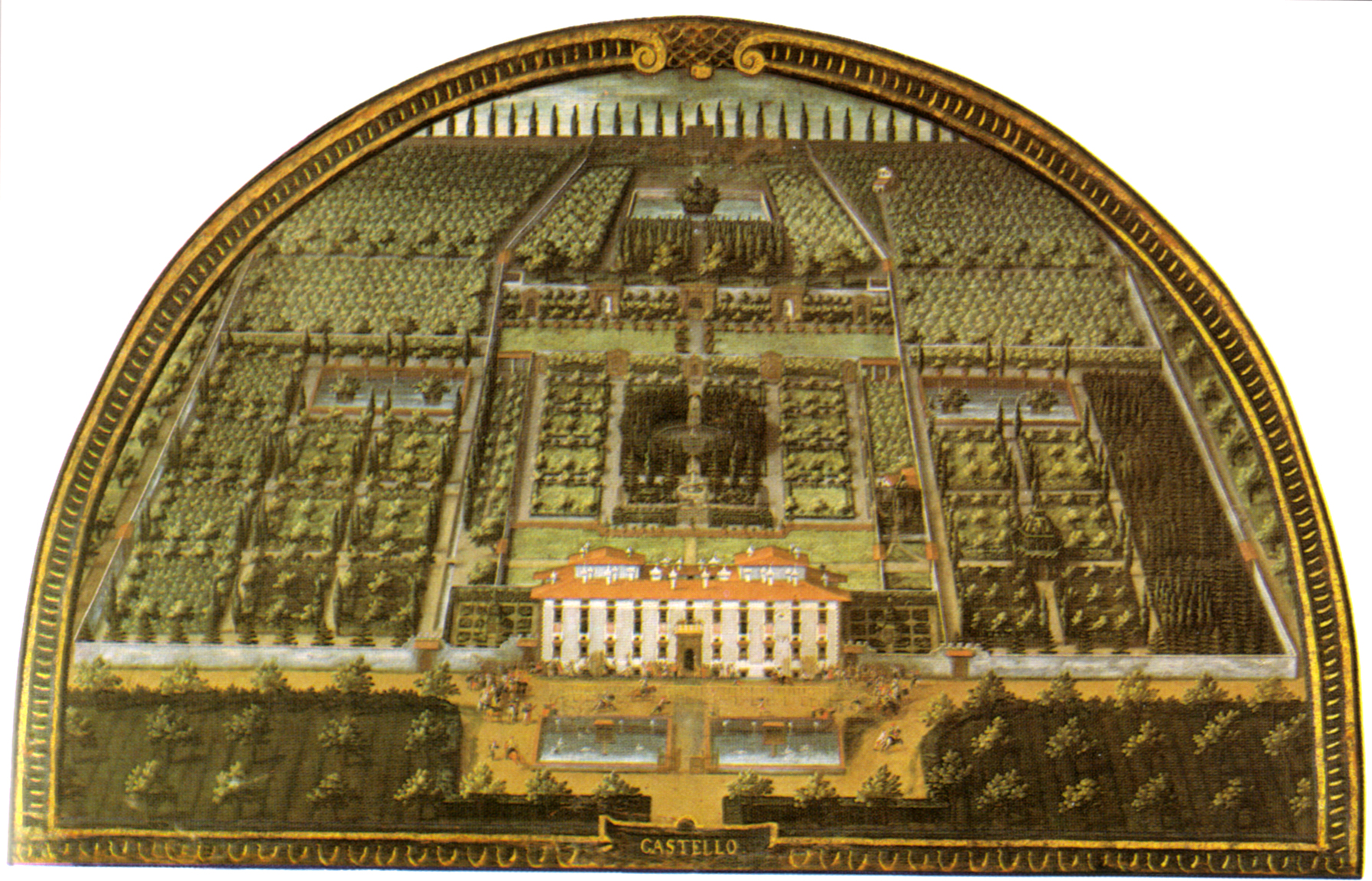
Villa di Castello

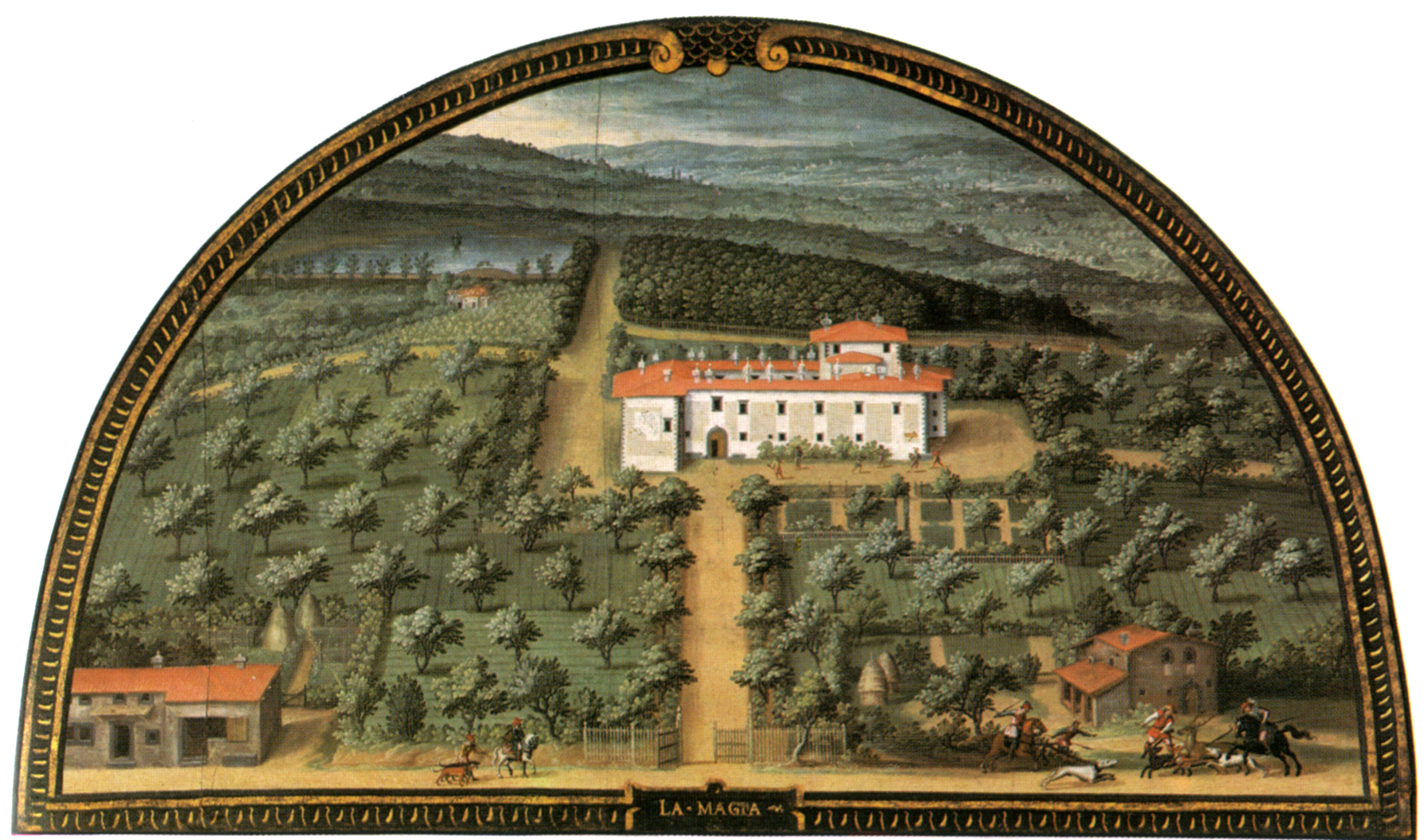
Villa La Magia

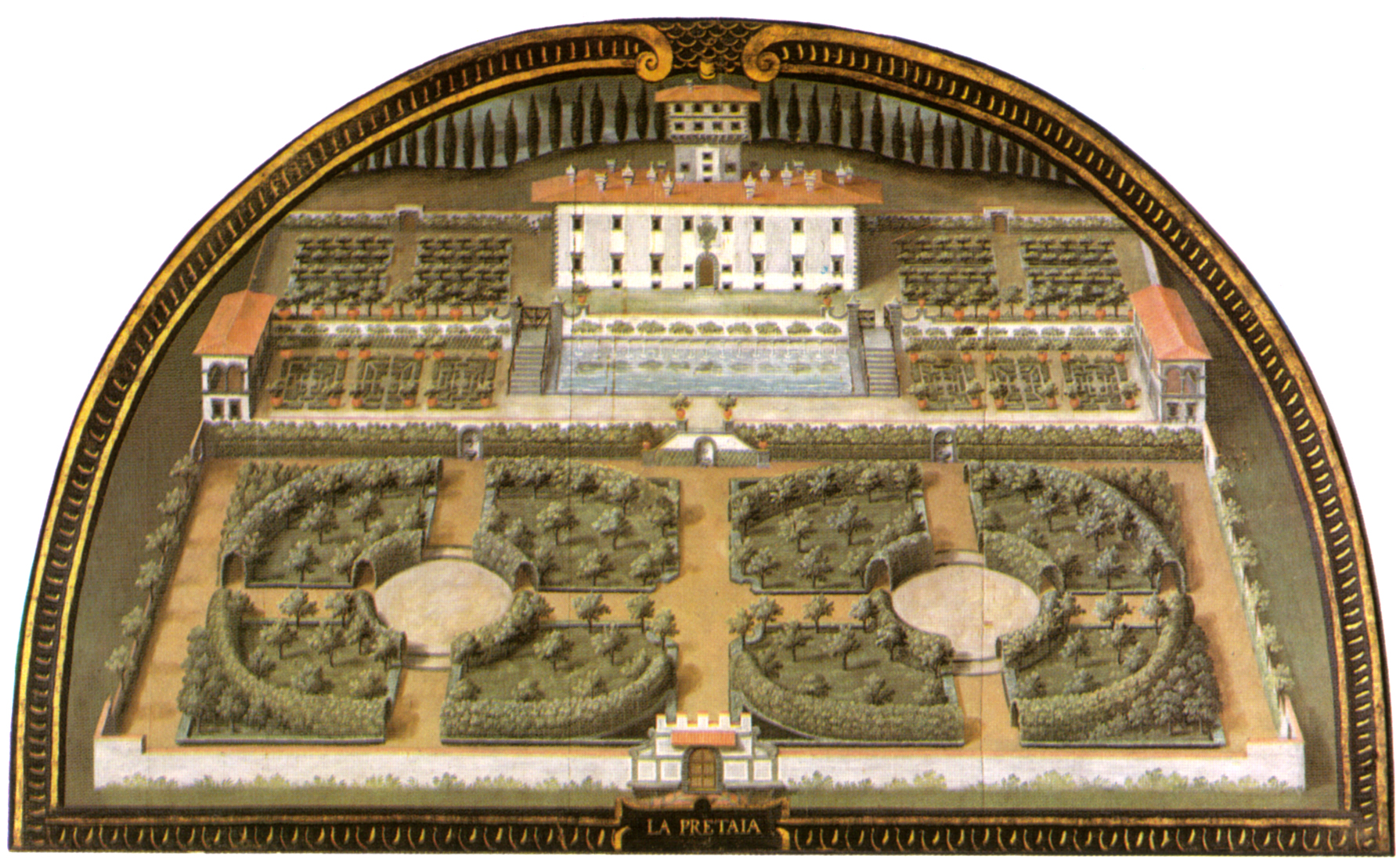
Villa La Petraia

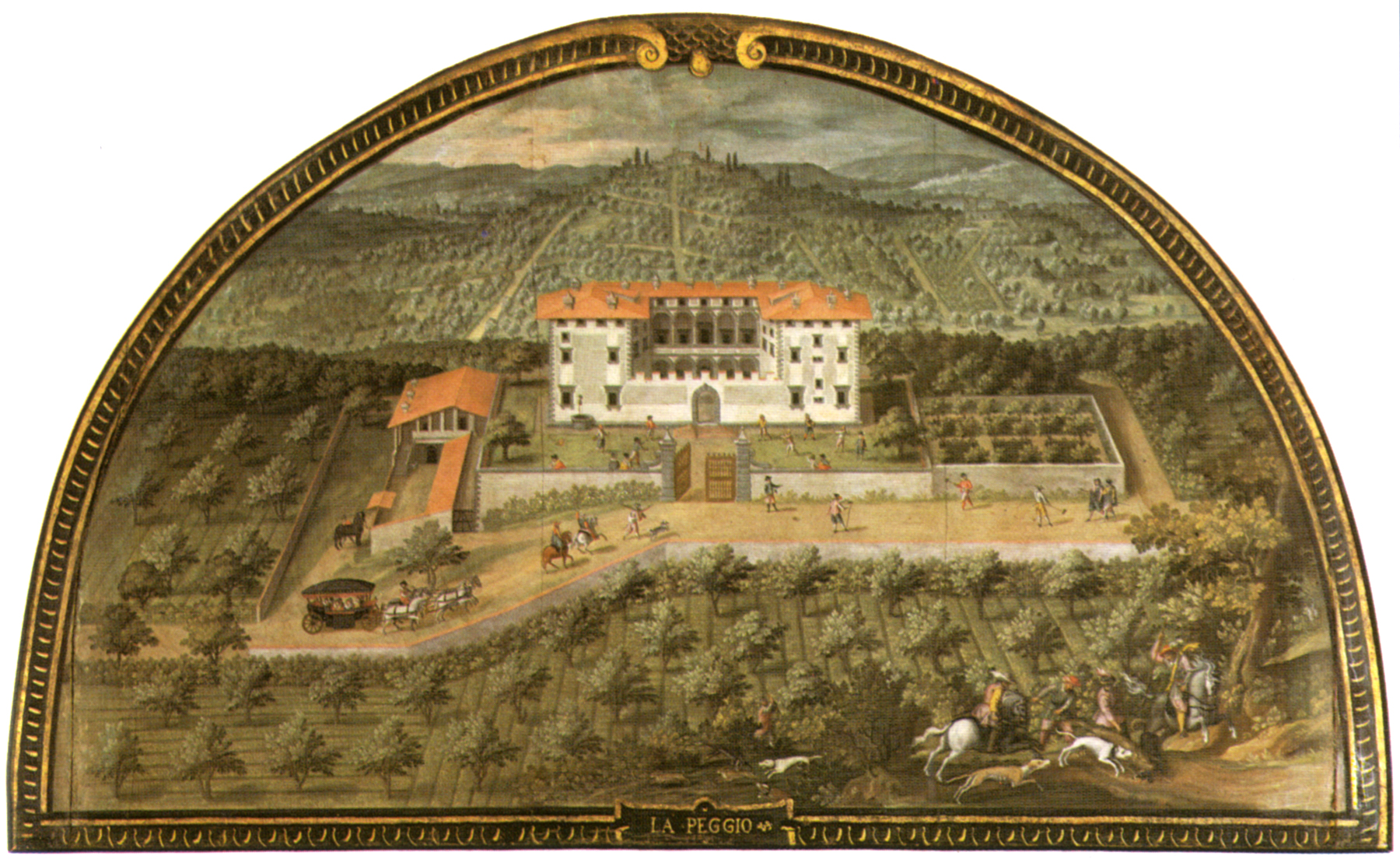
Villa di Lappeggi

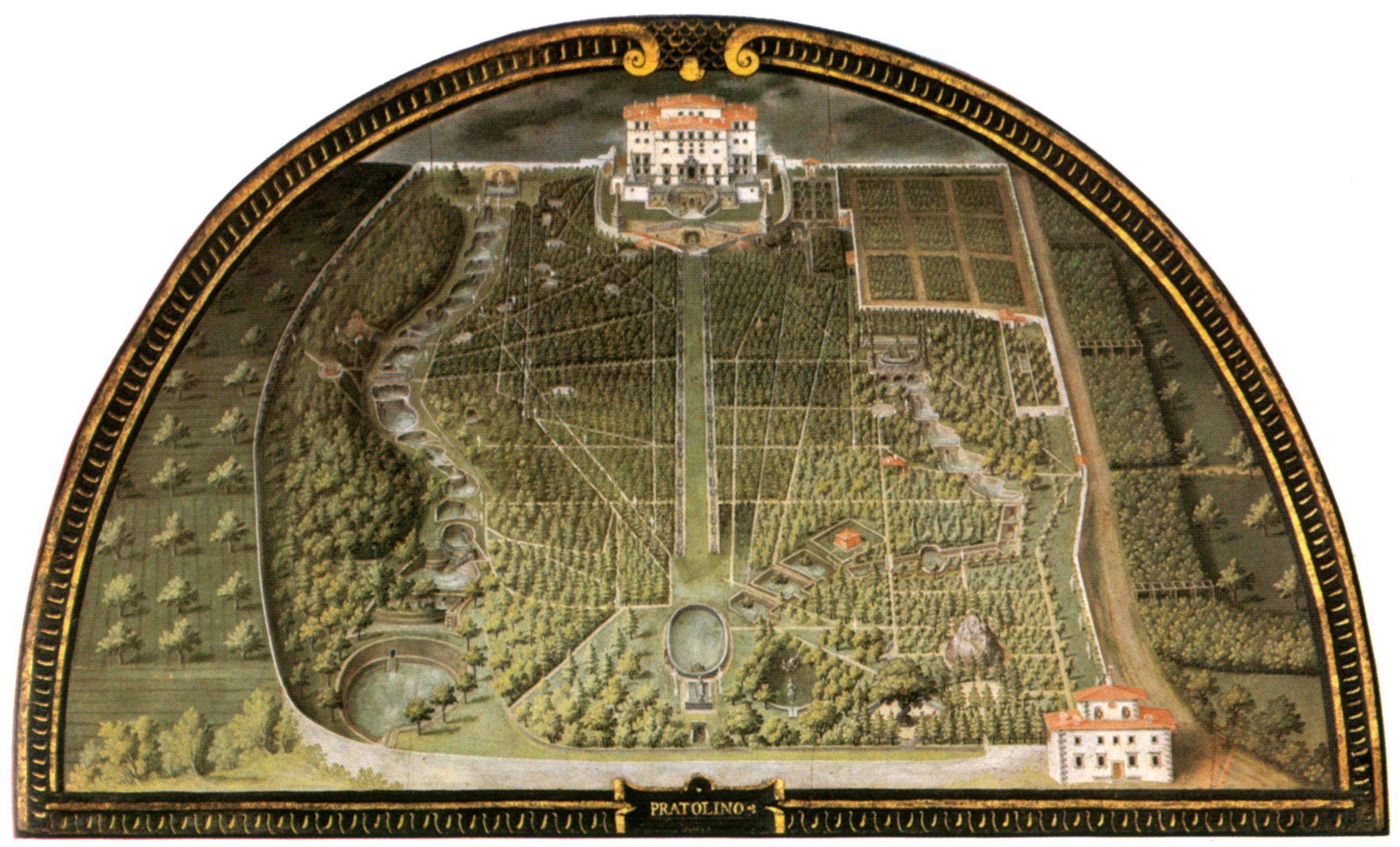
Villa di Pratolino

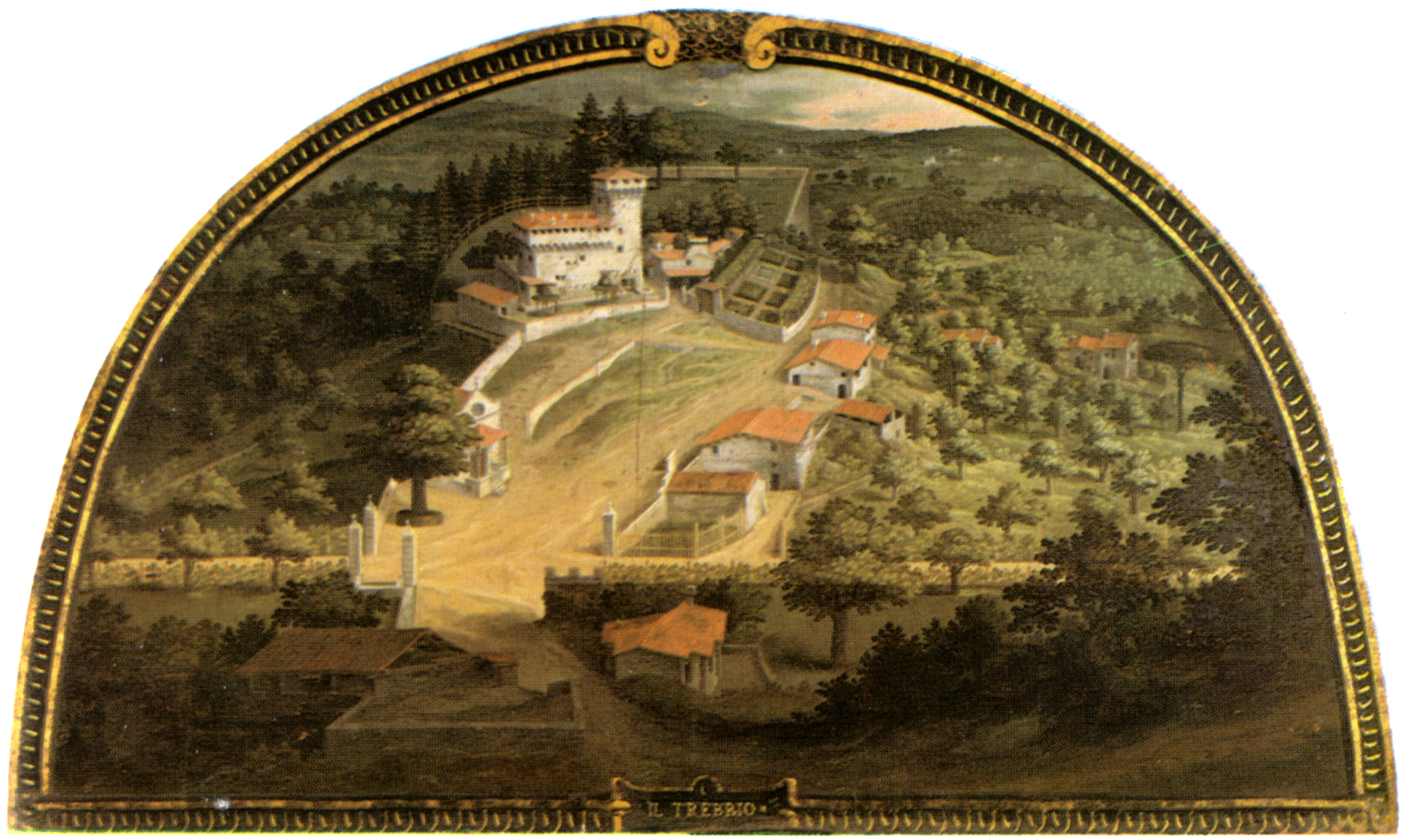
Villa del Trebbio

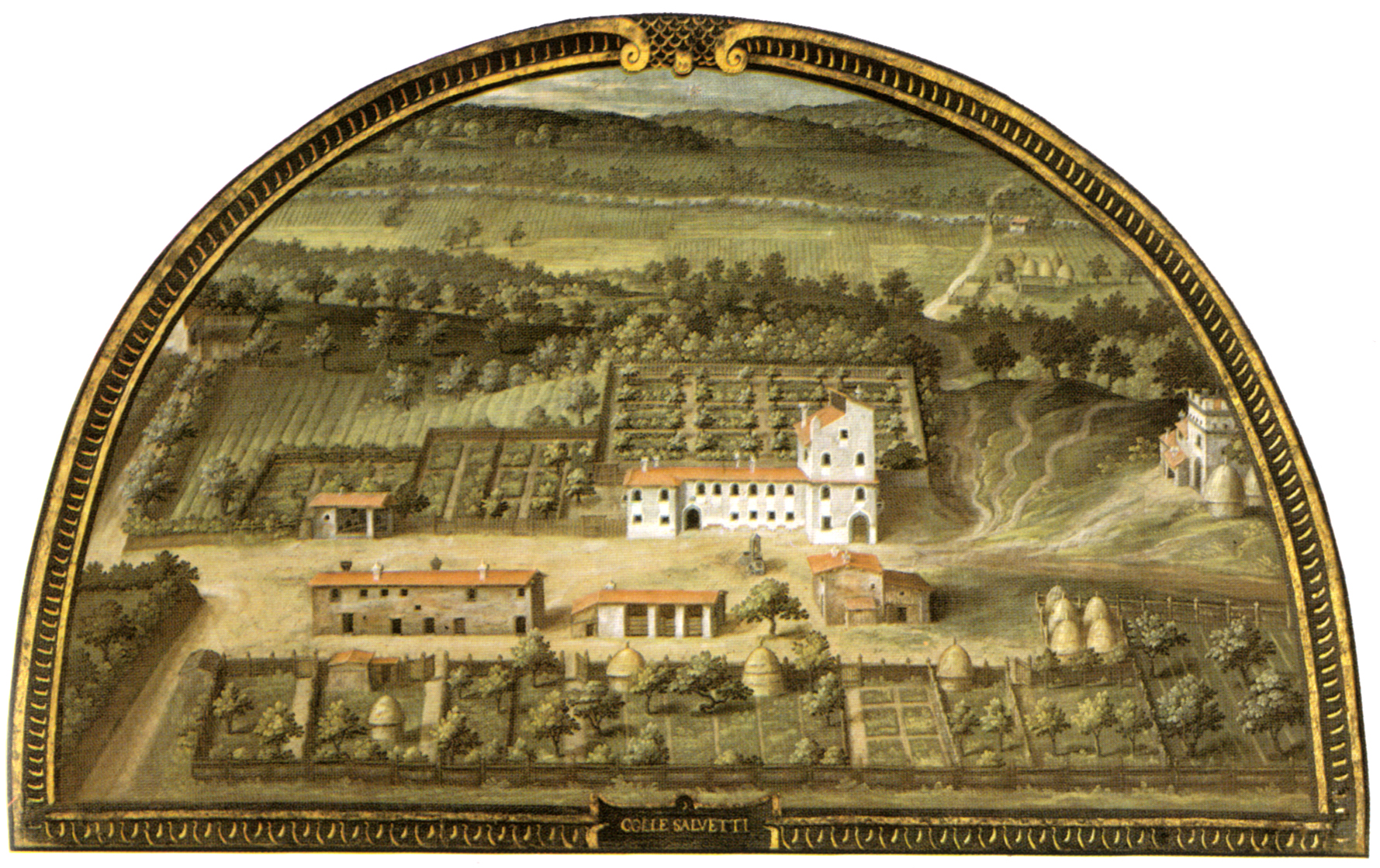
Villa di Colle Salvetti

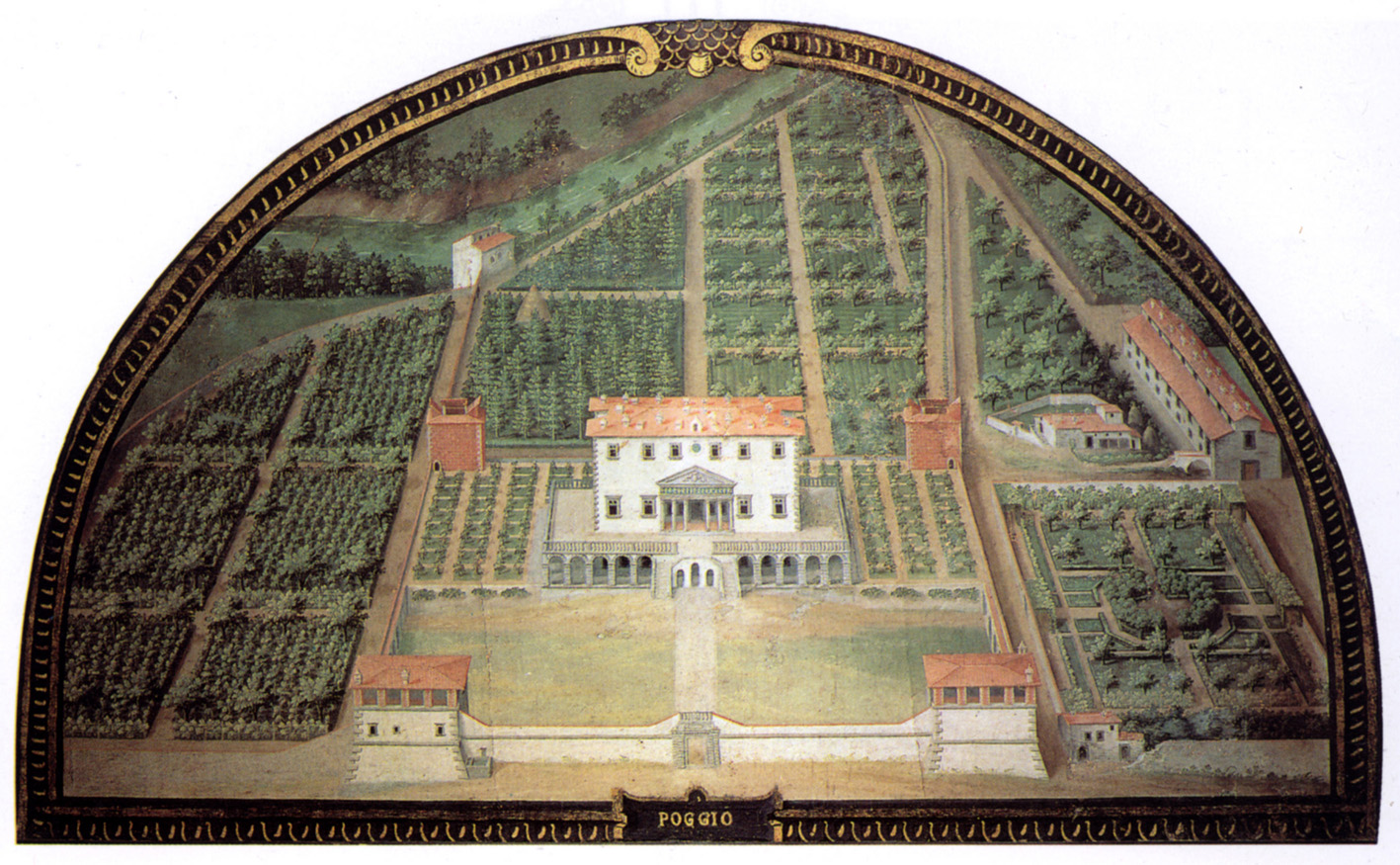
Villa di Poggio a Caiano

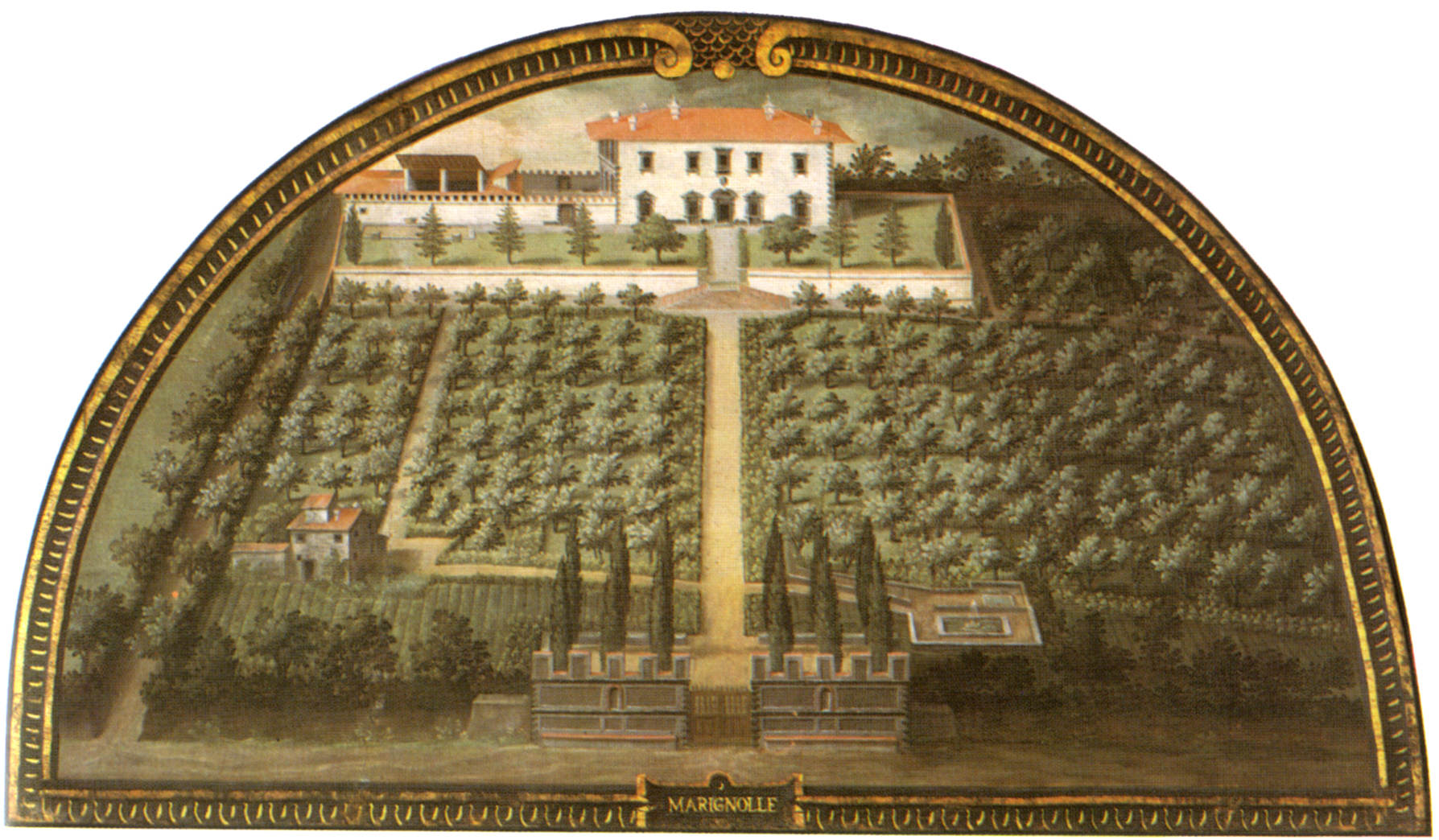
Villa di Marignolle

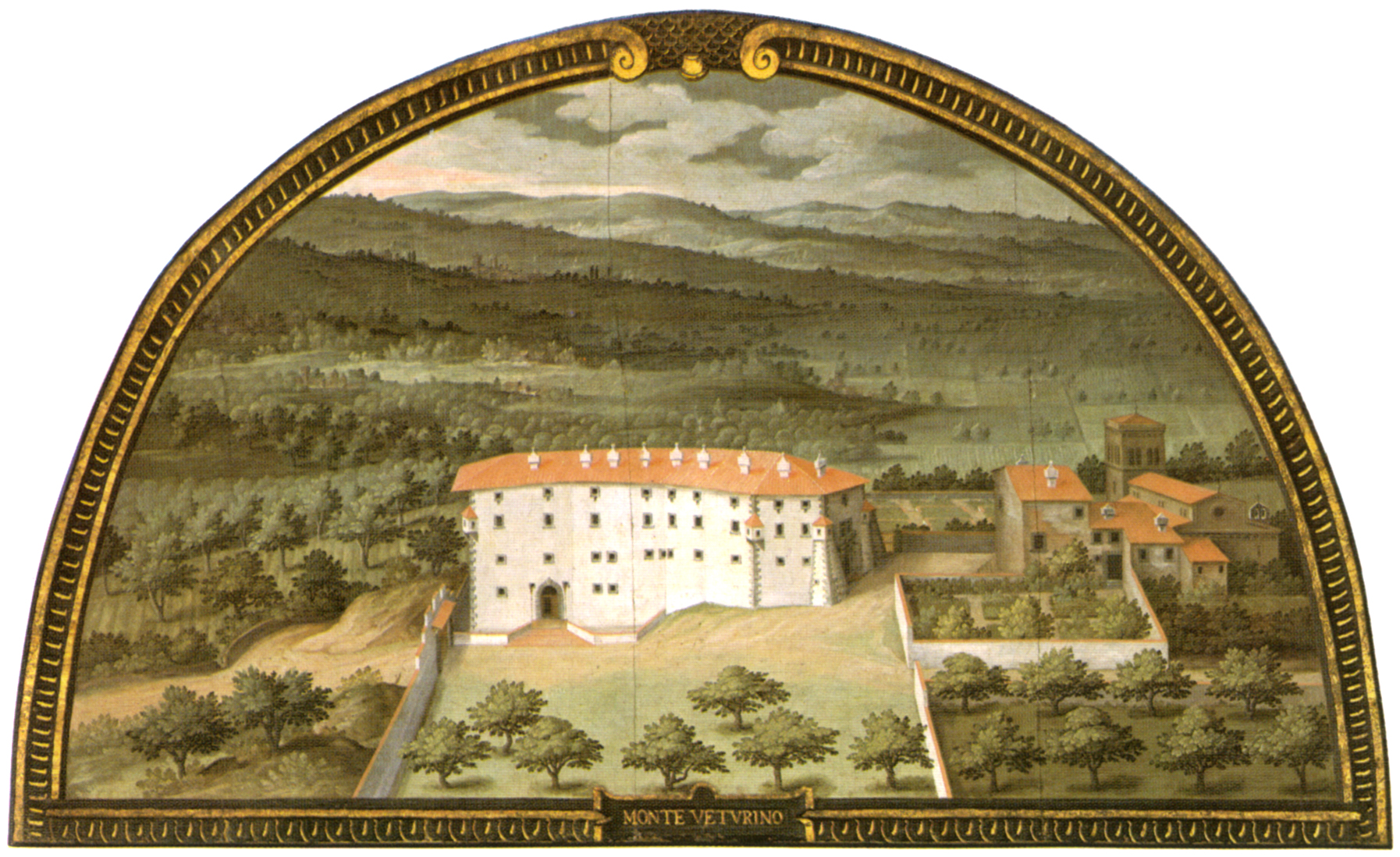
Villa di Montevettolini

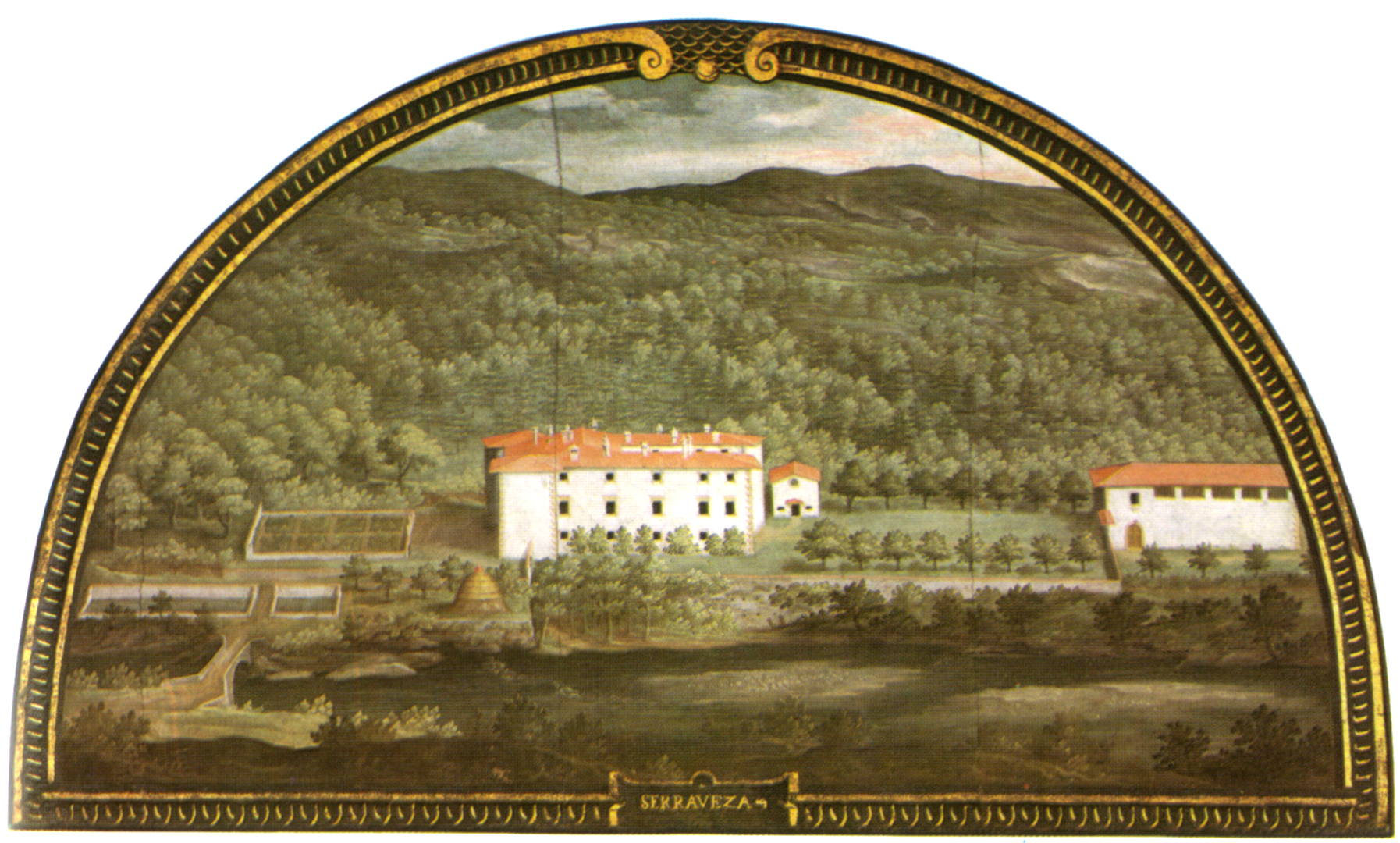
Villa di Seravezza

== See also ==
- Villa Medici, Fiesole
