= Quarrata =

- Comune
- Città di Quarrata
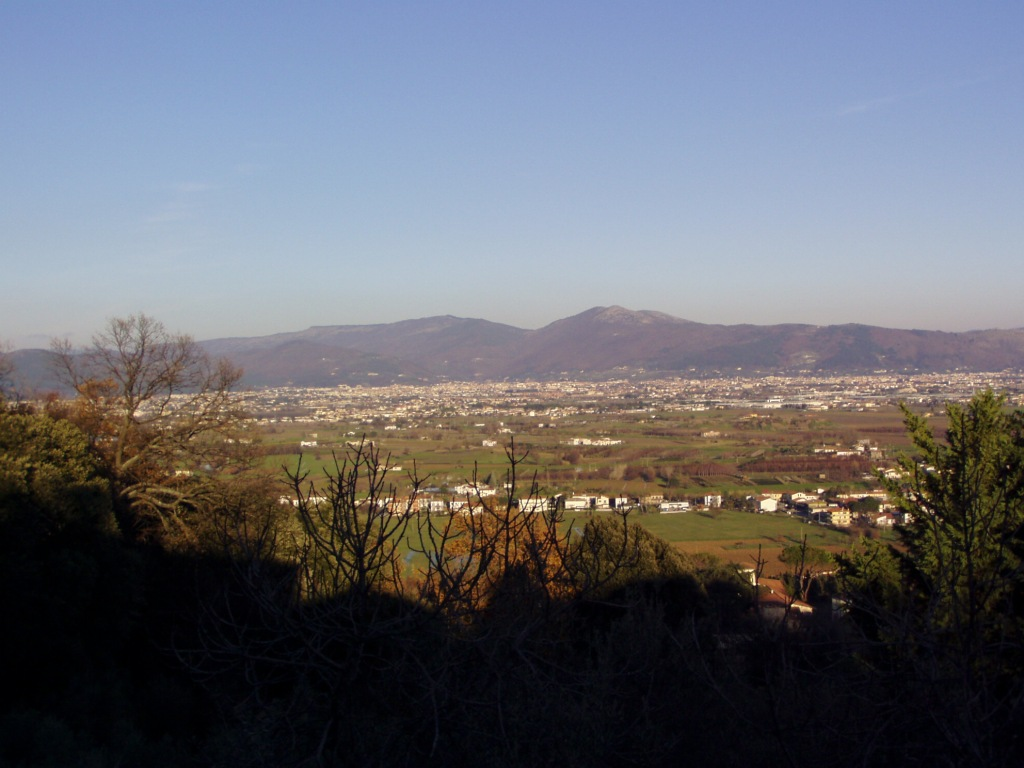
- View of Quarrata

- Location within Italy Location within Tuscany
- Coordinates: 43°50′51″N 10°59′0″E
- Country: Italy
- Region: Tuscany
- Province: Pistoia (PT)
- Frazioni: Barba, Buriano, Caserana, Casini, Catena, Ferruccia, Forrottoli, Lucciano, Montemagno, Montorio, Olmi, Santonuovo, Tizzana, Valenzatico, Vignole

Government
  - Mayor: Gabriele Romiti (PD)

Area
  - Total: 45.91 km^{2} (17.73 sq mi)
- Elevation: 48 m (157 ft)

Population (30 November 2016)
  - Total: 26,268
  - Density: 572.2/km^{2} (1,482/sq mi)
- Demonym: Quarratini
- Time zone: UTC+1 (CET)
  - Summer (DST): UTC+2 (CEST)
- Postal code: 51039
- Dialing code: 0573
- Website: Official website

Quarrata is a comune (municipality) in the Province of Pistoia in the Italian region Tuscany, located about 30 kilometres (19 mi) west of Florence and about 10 kilometres (6 mi) south of Pistoia.

== Main sights ==
- Propositura (church) of Santa Maria Assunta
- Pieve (pleban church) of San Bartolomeo at Tizzana, one of the frazioni of the municipality. Nearby are remains, including a standing watch tower, of the medieval castle
- Villa La Magia, an example of Medici villa
- Fattoria Santonuovo, an 18th-century patrician villa
- Church of San Michele Arcangelo in Vignole, characterized by a 14th-century bell tower

== Sport ==
The British Cycling academy has made Quarrata its training base for a number of years and as a result a number of British cyclists make their home in Quarrata, including Mark Cavendish, Steve Cummings, Peter Kennaugh and Geraint Thomas.

== Twin towns ==
- Vaslui, Romania
- (Sahrawi Arab Democratic Republic) Agounit, Western Sahara
