= Villa Medici (disambiguation) =

Villa Medici or Palazzo Medici can refer to several buildings in Italy:

- Villa Medici, Rome
- Medici villas, Tuscany
- Palazzo Medici, Florence
