= Villa di Montevettolini =

Medici villa in Tuscany, central Italy

Coordinates: 43°51′32.73″N 10°50′47.69″E

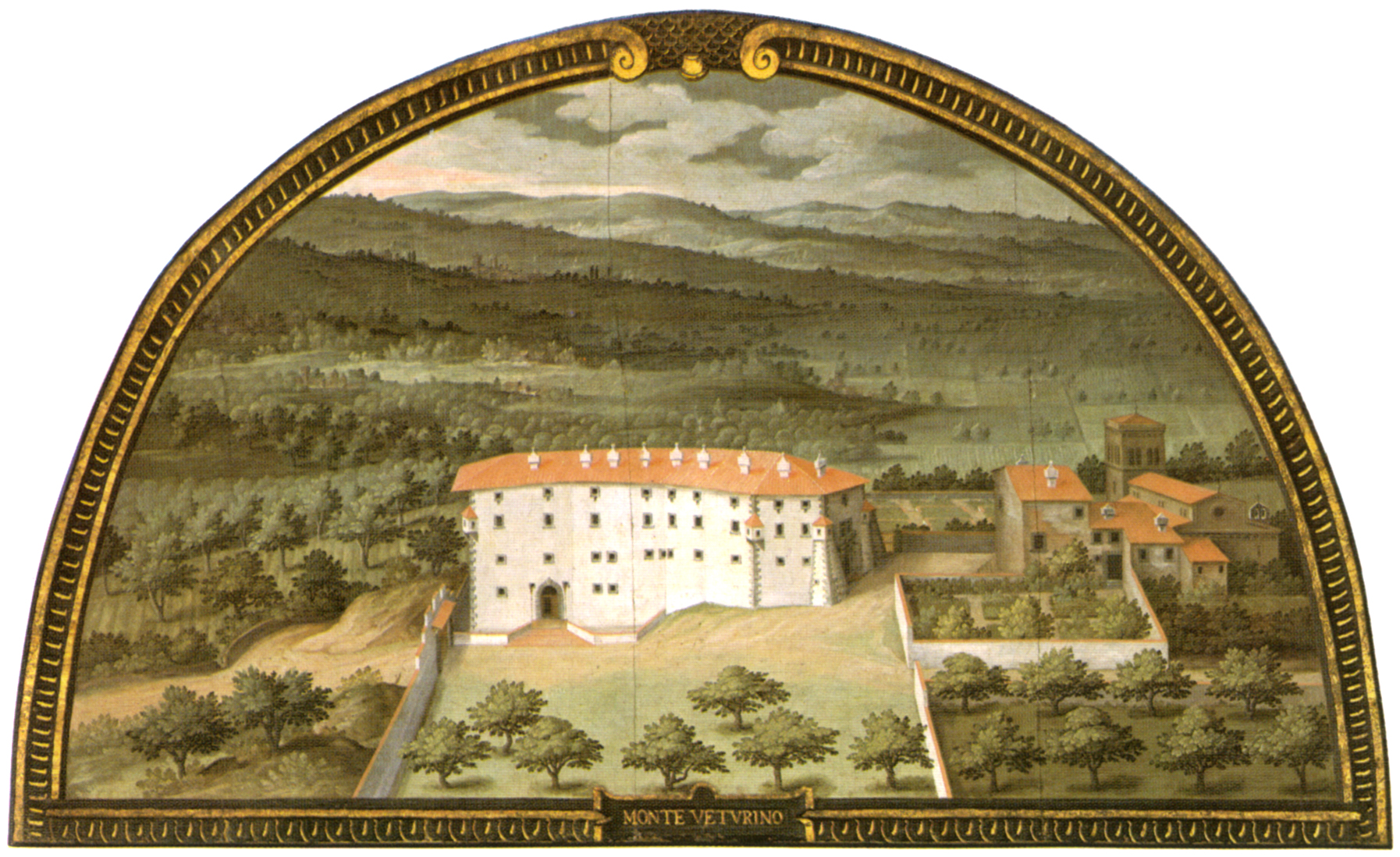
Villa di Montevettolini by Giusto Utens.

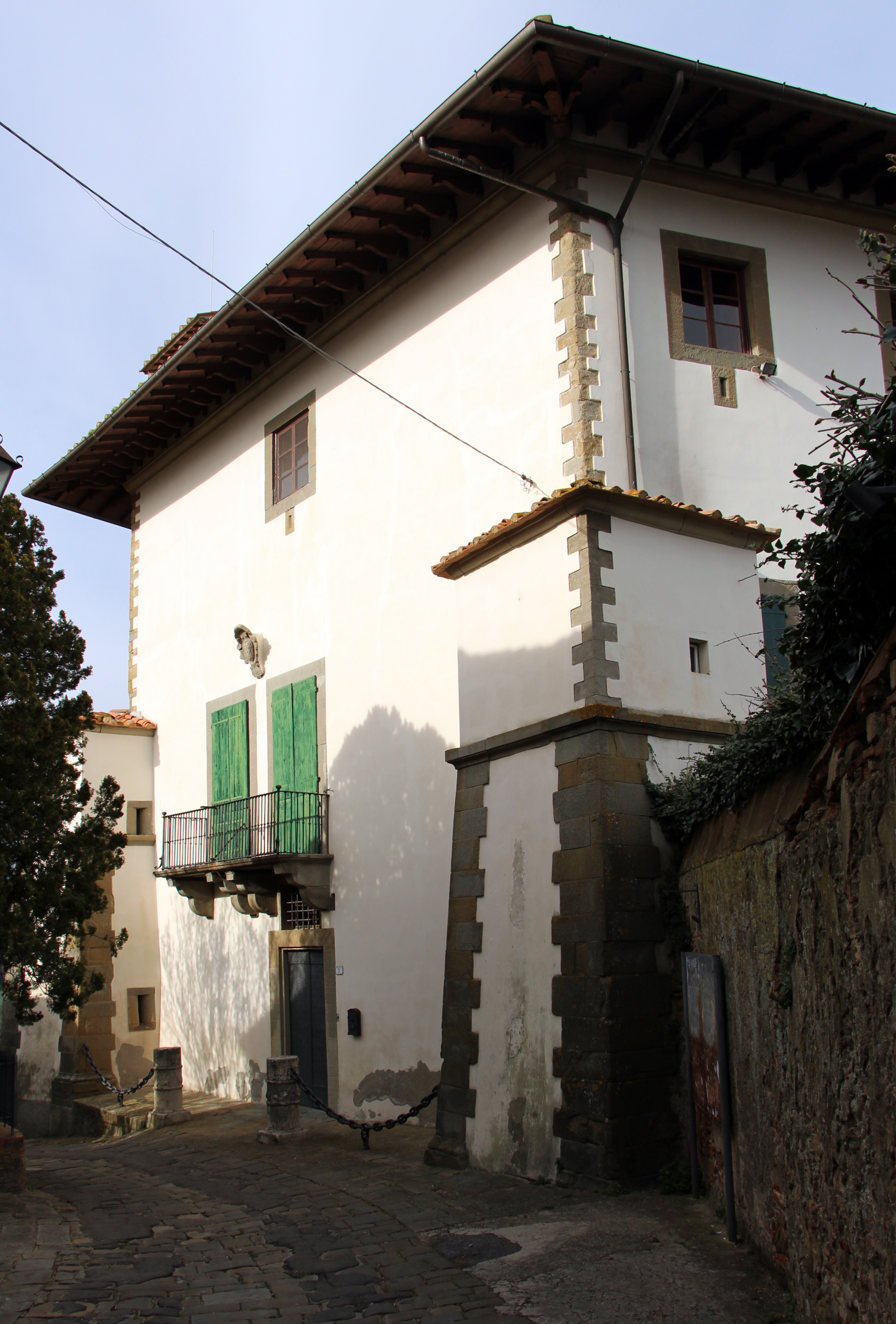
Rear view of the villa.

The Villa di Montevettolini is a Medici villa in the comune of Monsummano Terme, Tuscany, central Italy.

== History ==
Also called Monte Veturino, the villa was built after 1595 on commission of Grand Duke Ferdinand I of Tuscany. It is located on a high hill at the feet of Monte Albano, where a large hunting reserve (the so-called Parco Reale) was located. The architect was Gherardo Mechini, a pupil of Bernardo Buontalenti. He included some pre-existing structures from the medieval borough, such as a fortress and a stretch of walls, in the villa construction. The building was finished with the 1620s. The result was a villa with a severe and compact appearance and polygonal plan, which resembled a defensive fortress more than a patrician residence. It was used as administrative base for the Medici estates in the area.

The villa was depicted by Giusto Utens in a series of lunettes portraying the Medici villas. The building was frequently used by Ferdinand I; his grandson Ferdinand II sold it and its surrounding lands in 1650 to the Bartolomei family. In 1871 it was acquired by prince Marcantonio Borghese, who was also owner of the Villa Medici di Cafaggiolo. Borghese restored the villa. As of 2019, the Borghese family still owns the site.

== Sources ==
- Lapi Bini, Isabella (2003). Le ville medicee. Guida Completa. Florence: Giunti.
- Mignani, Daniela (1993). Le Ville Medicee di Giusto Utens. Arnaud.
