= Museo di Firenze com'era =

Italian museum

Coordinates: 43.7724°N 11.2601°E

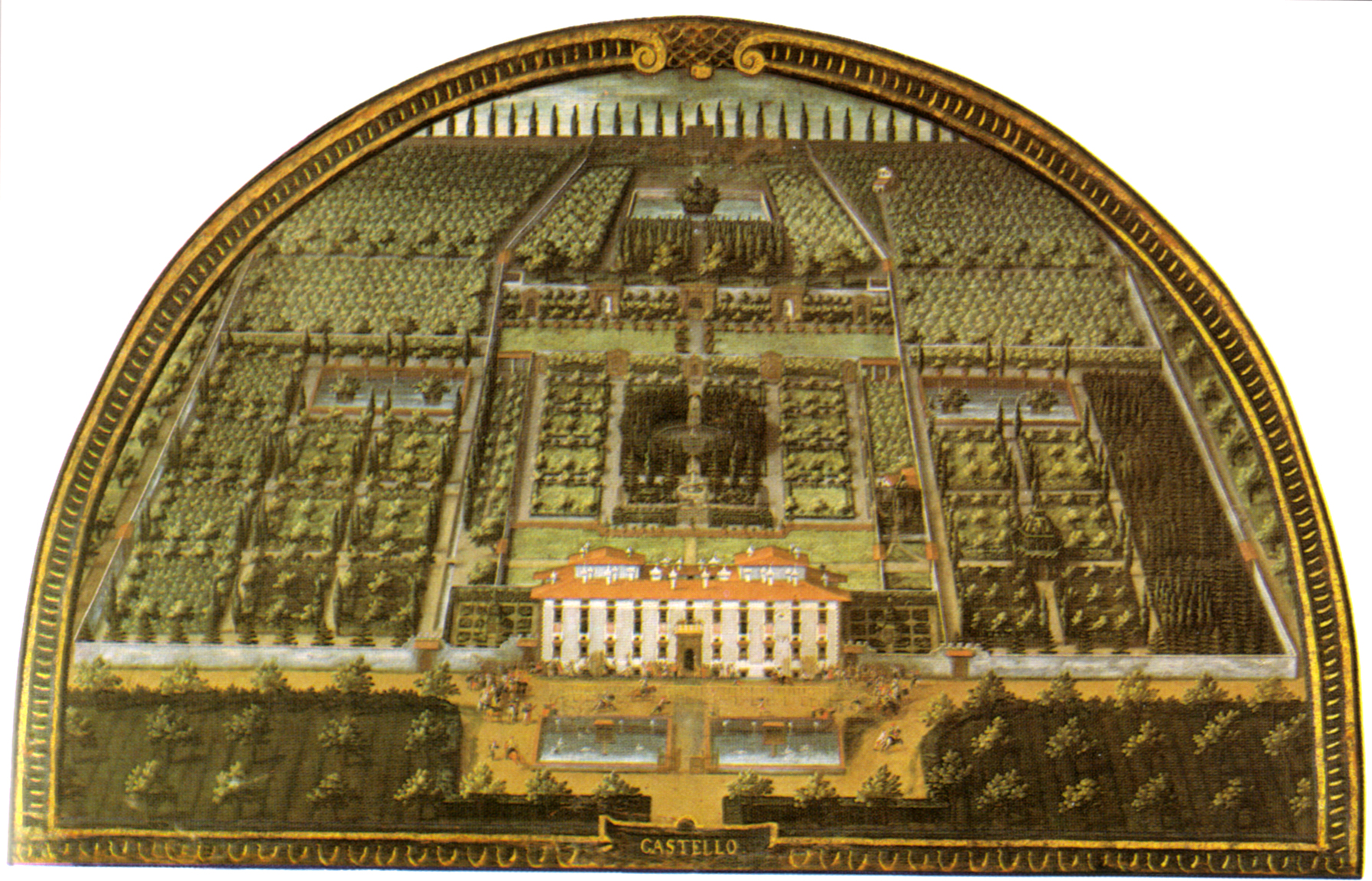
Lunette of Villa di Castello as it appeared in 1599, painted by Giusto Utens, formerly in the collection of Museo di Firenze com'era

Museo di Firenze com'era ("Museum of Florence as it was") was a history and archaeology museum, one of the civic museums of the city of Florence.

The museum was located on Via dell'Oriuolo in a former convent of the Oblates. It closed permanently in October 2010 to make space for the enlargement of the Biblioteca delle Oblate. Some of its exhibits will be incorporated into a new City museum portraying Florence through the ages, to be housed in Palazzo Vecchio.

The museum's collections included the 14 surviving paintings of Medici villas by Giusto Utens. These were transferred in 2014 to a new permanent gallery at Petraia Villa Medici.
