= Villa La Magia =

Villa in Quarrata

UNESCO World Heritage Site
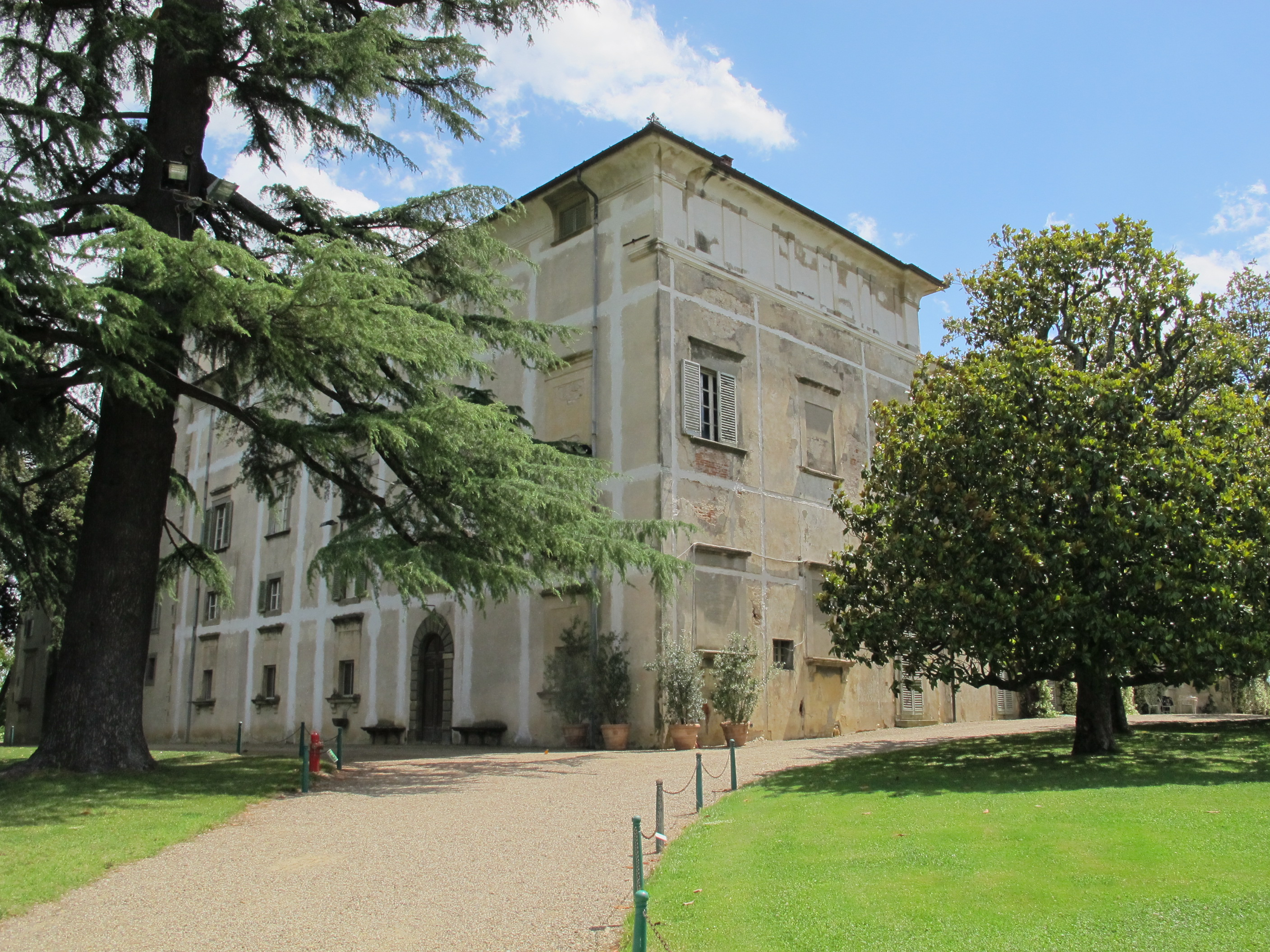
- Villa La Magia in Quarrata

- Location within Tuscany Location within Italy
- Official name: Villa La Magia
- Location: Quarrata, Tuscany, Italy
- Part of: Medici Villas and Gardens in Tuscany
- Criteria: (ii), (iv), (vi)
- Reference: 175
- Inscription: 2013 (37th Session)
- Coordinates: 43.8516°N 10.9726°E

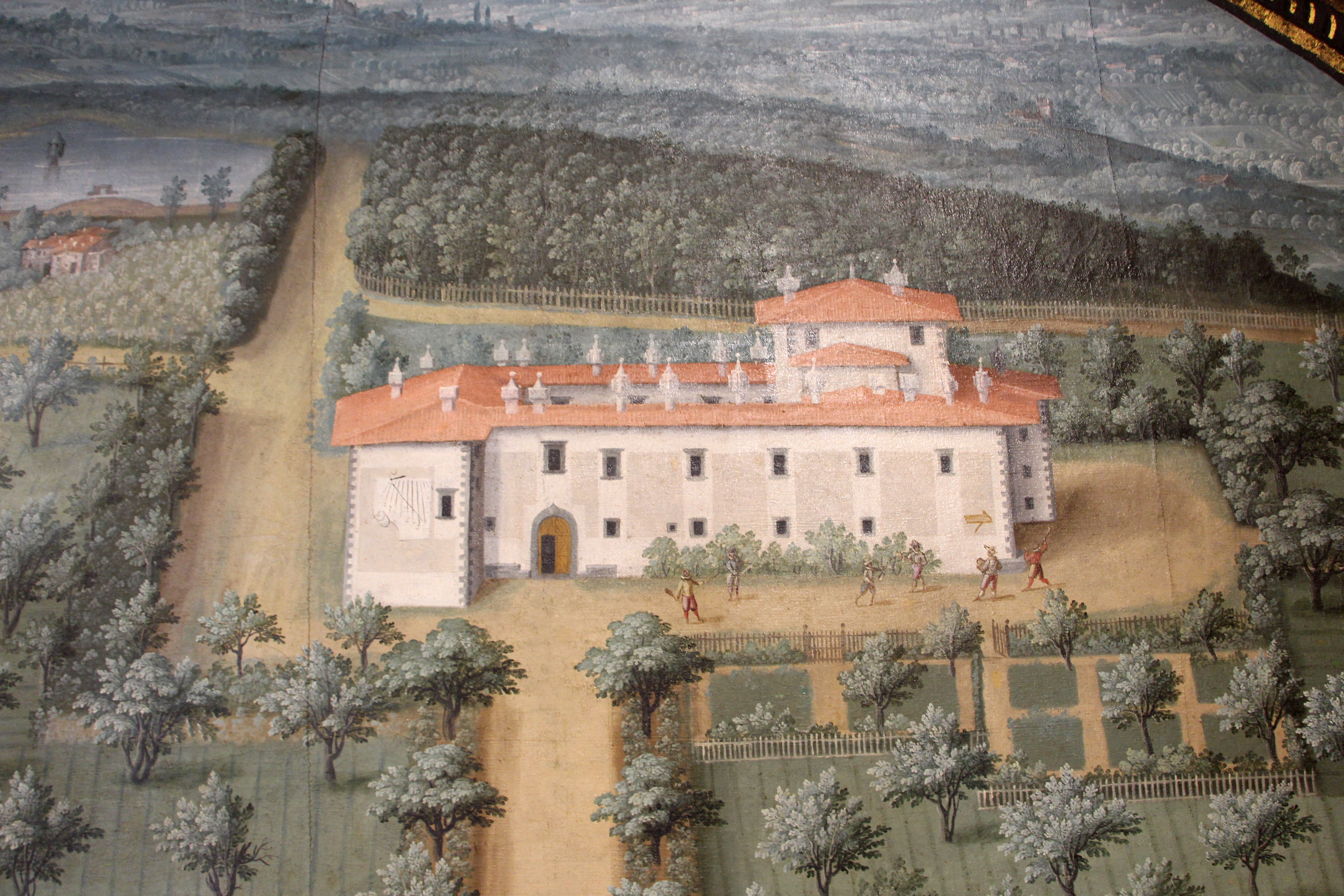
The villa in about 1600, from a lunette painted by Giusto Utens

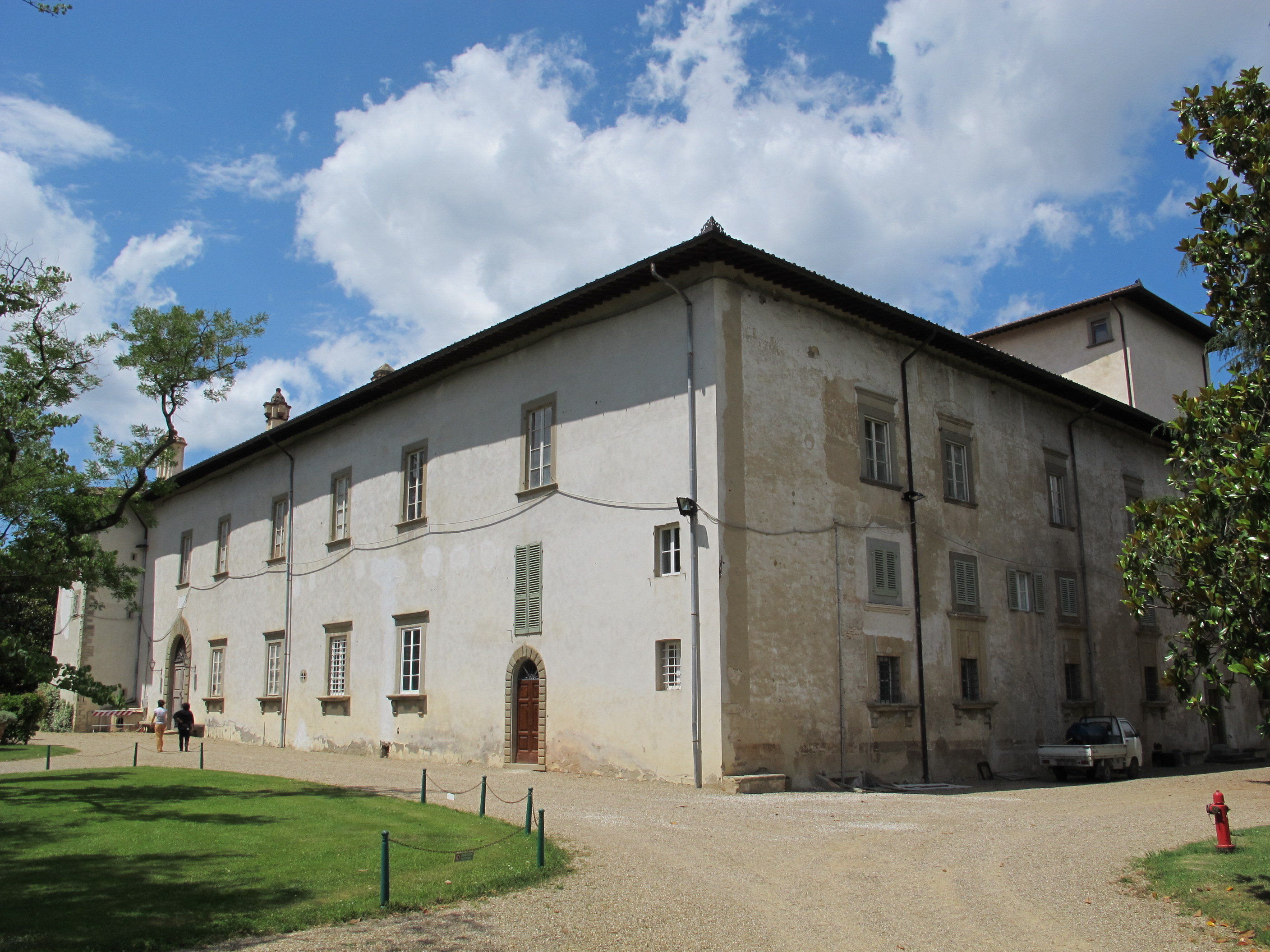
Exterior

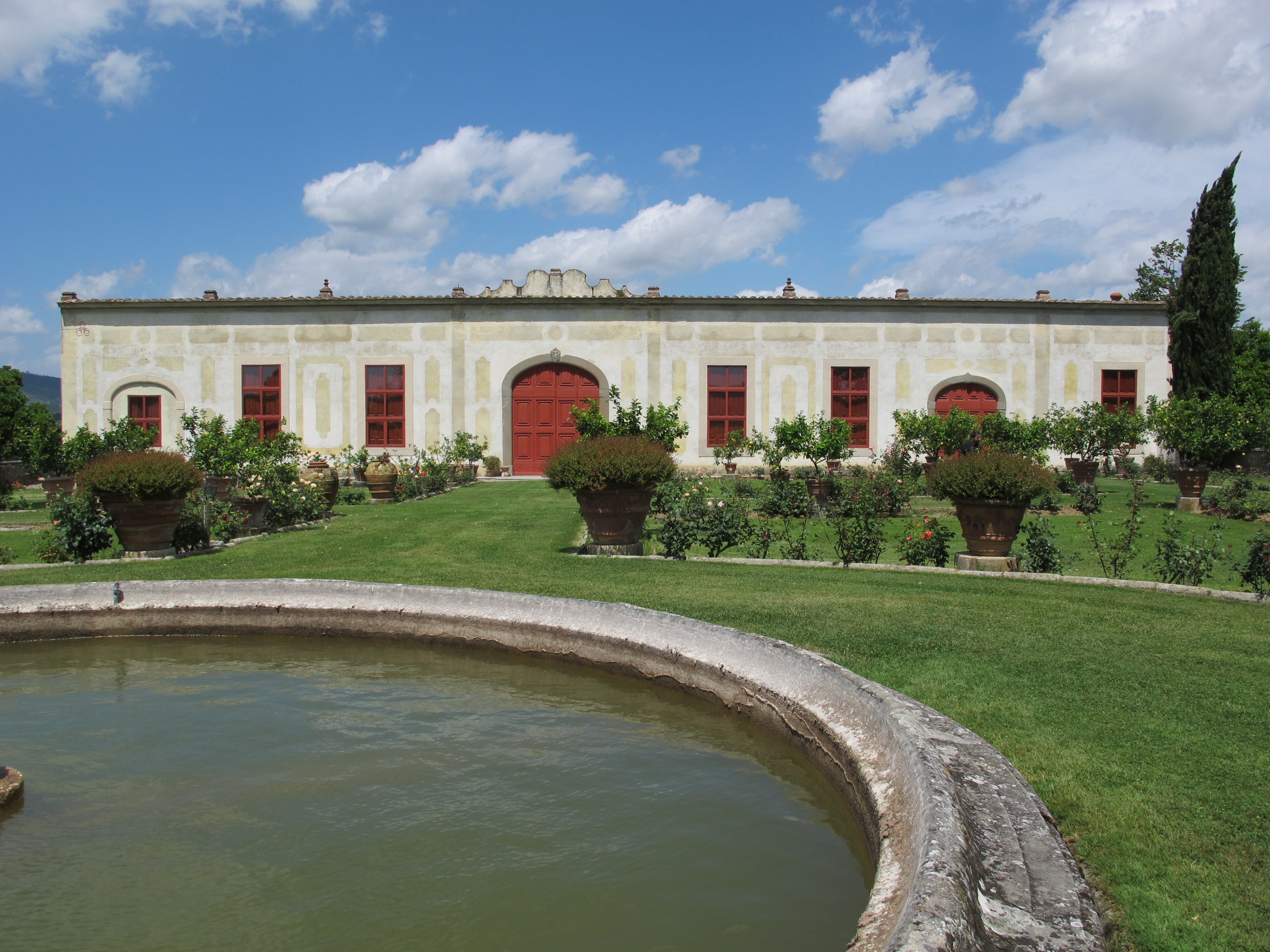
The limonaia

Villa La Magia is a Medici villa in the comune of Quarrata, in the province of Pistoia, to the west of Florence, Tuscany, central Italy. It was built by the Panciatichi family in the fourteenth century, and was bought by Francesco I de' Medici in 1583 or 1584. It has been owned by the comune of Quarrata since 2000, and since 2013 has been one of the fourteen sites which together make up a UNESCO World Heritage Site, the Medici Villas and Gardens in Tuscany.
