= Villa Medici at Careggi =

- Villa Medicea di Careggi
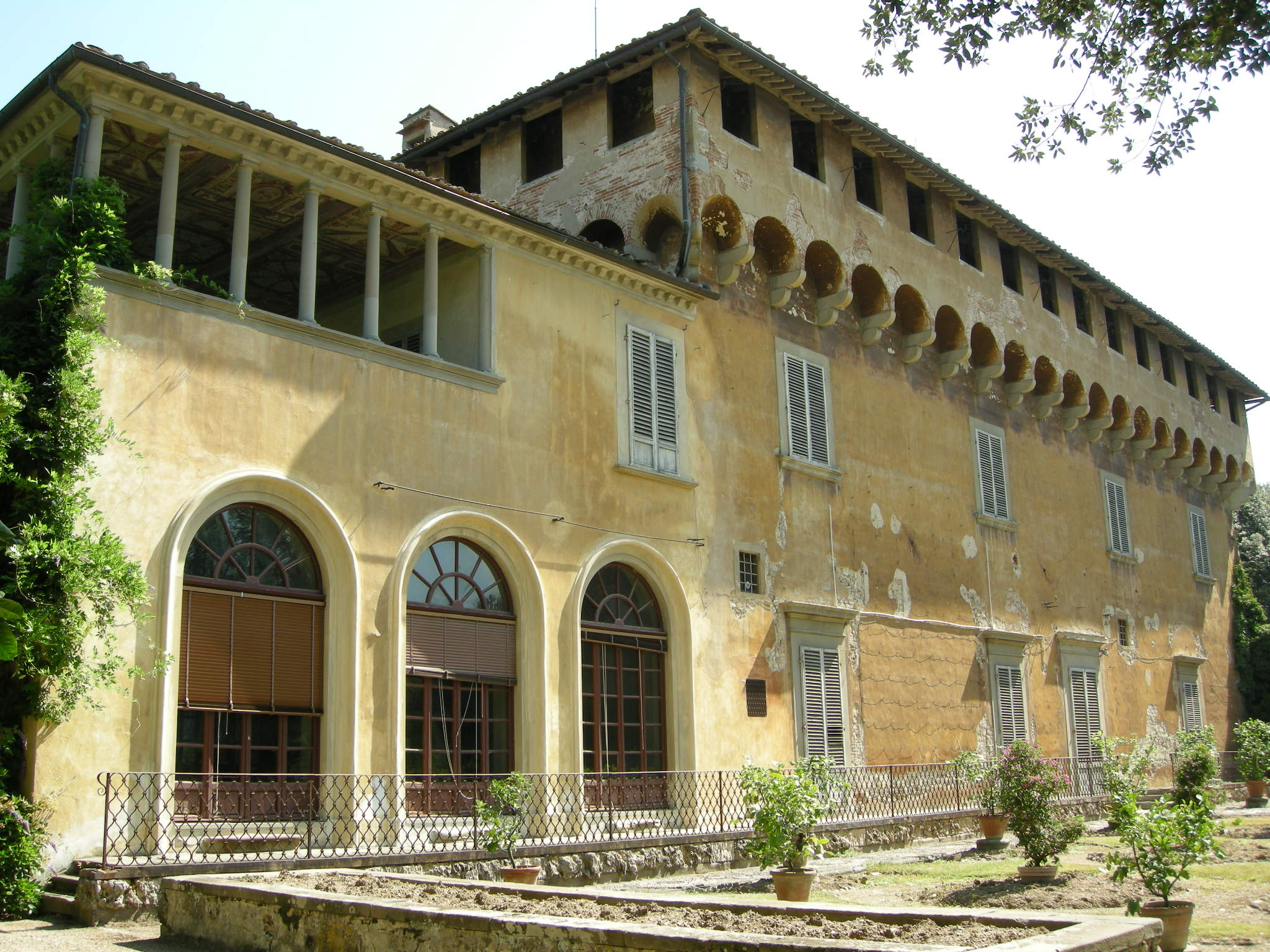
- Villa Medici in Careggi façade
- Interactive map of the Villa Medici at Careggi area

General information
- Status: Closed
- Type: Villa
- Architectural style: Italian Renaissance
- Location: Careggi, Toscana, Italy
- Coordinates: 43°48′33.8″N 11°14′58.2″E
- Construction started: c. 1325
- Owner: Regione Toscana

Design and construction
- Architect: Michelozzo

Website
- Villa Medicea Careggi

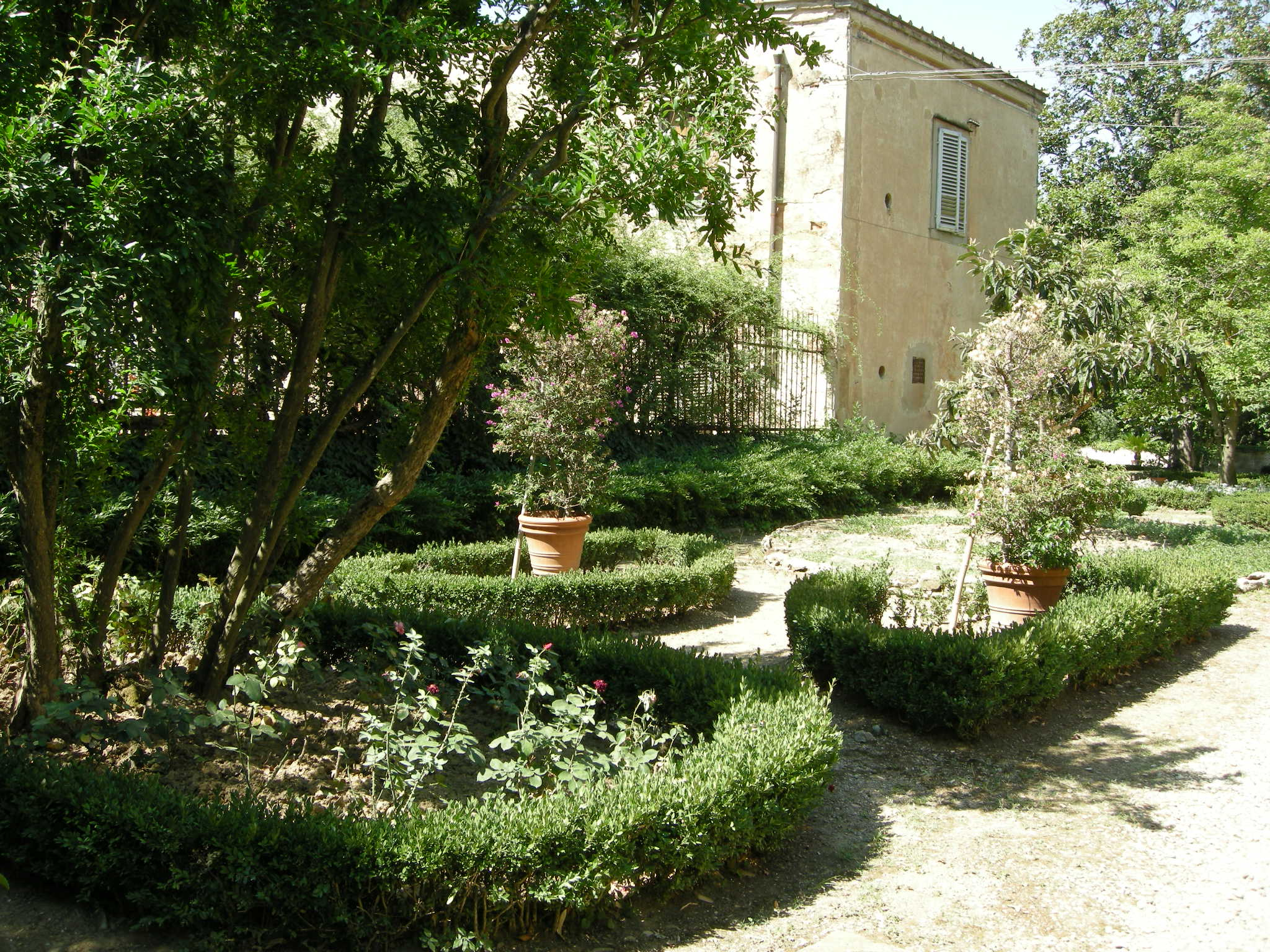
Garden.

The Villa Medici at Careggi is a patrician villa in the hills near Florence, Tuscany, central Italy. It is part of the UNESCO World Heritage Site inscribed as Medici Villas and Gardens in Tuscany.

== History ==
The villa was among the first of a number of Medici villas, notable as the site of the Platonic Academy founded by Cosimo de' Medici, who died at the villa in 1464. Like most villas of Florentine families, the villa remained a working farm that helped render the family self-sufficient. Cosimo's architect there, as elsewhere, was Michelozzo, who remodelled the fortified villa which had something of the character of a castello. Its famous garden is walled about, like a medieval garden, overlooked by the upper-storey loggias, with which Michelozzo cautiously opened up the villa's structure. Michelozzo's Villa Medici in Fiesole has a more outward-looking, Renaissance character.

The property was purchased in 1417 by Cosimo de' Medici brother, Lorenzo. At the death of Giovanni di Bicci, Cosimo il Vecchio set about remodelling the beloved villa around its loggia-enclosed central courtyard. His grandson Lorenzo extended the terraced gardens and the shaded boschi.

Marsilio Ficino, who died at the villa in 1499, was a central member of the Platonic Academy. Lorenzo de' Medici died at the villa in 1492, after which it was ignored for a time until about 1615, when Cardinal Carlo de' Medici undertook extensive projects to remodel the interior, and bring the garden up to date.

The villa property was purchased from the Lorraine heirs of the Medici in 1779 by Vincenzo Orsi; the Orsi heirs sold it to an Englishman, Francis Sloane, in 1848: Sloane planted exotics in the landscape: Cedar of Lebanon and Himalayan cedars, Californian sequoias, arbutus from the eastern Mediterranean and palms, which give the grounds their feeling of an arboretum. Today the villa belongs to the Tuscan public administration.

It is currently in the process of restoration and is still closed to the public as of September 2026.
