= Medici villas =

World heritage site in Italy

Medici Villas and Gardens in Tuscany
UNESCO World Heritage Site
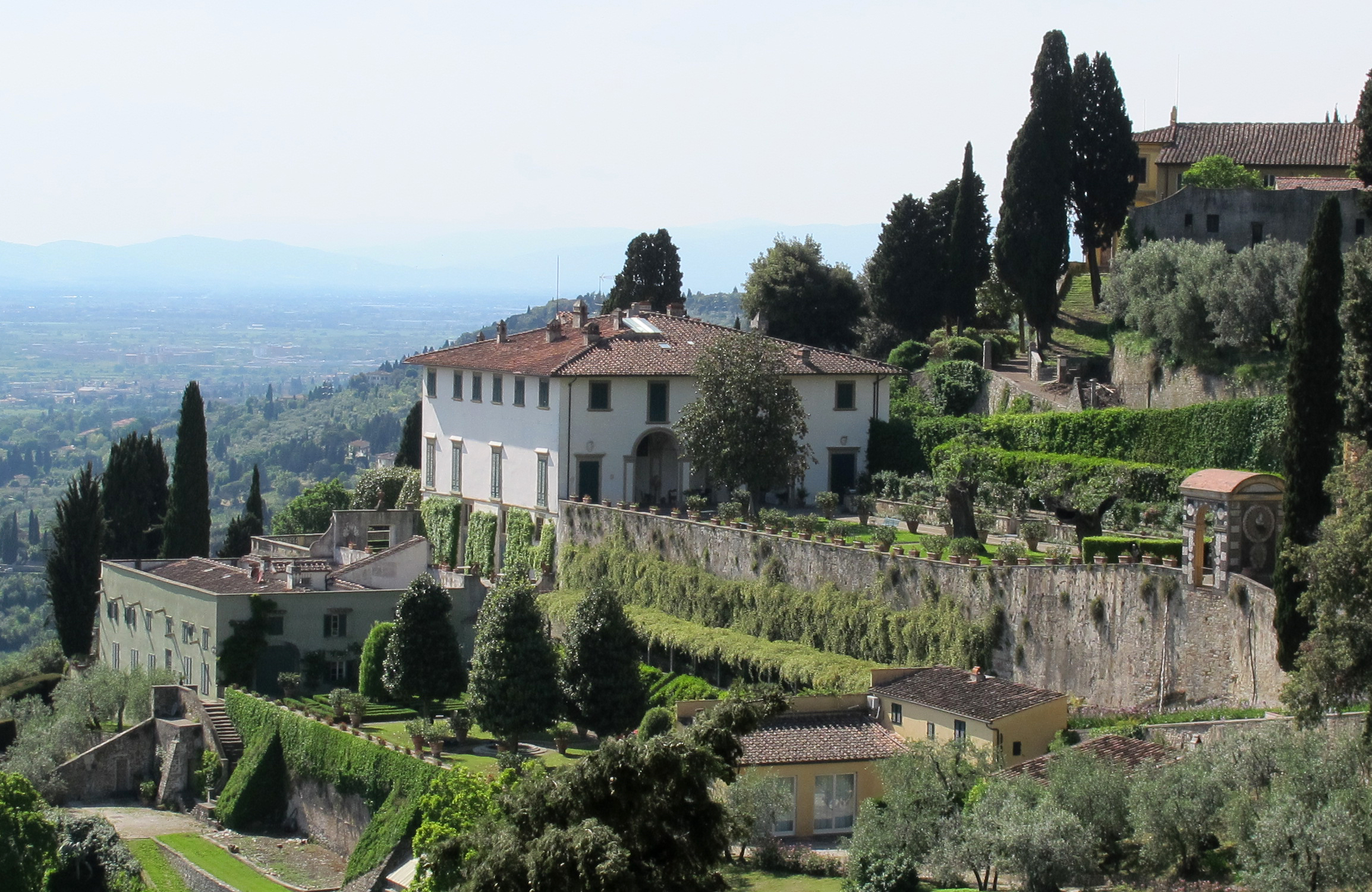
- Medici villa of Fiesole (1457)

- Location within Tuscany Location within Italy
- Location: Tuscany, Italy
- Criteria: Cultural: (ii), (iv), (vi)
- Reference: 175
- Inscription: 2013 (37th Session)
- Area: 125.4 ha (310 acres)
- Buffer zone: 3,539.08 ha (8,745.3 acres)
- Coordinates: 43°51′28″N 11°18′15″E

Localization of major and minor Medici villas in Tuscany

The Medici villas are a series of rural building complexes in Tuscany which were owned by members of the Medici family between the 15th century and the 17th century. The villas served several functions: they were the country palaces of the Medici, scattered over the territory that they ruled, demonstrating their power and wealth. They were also recreational resorts for the leisure and pleasure of their owners; and, more prosaically, they were the centre of agricultural activities on the surrounding estates. In 2013, the Medici villas were added to UNESCO's World Heritage list.

== History ==
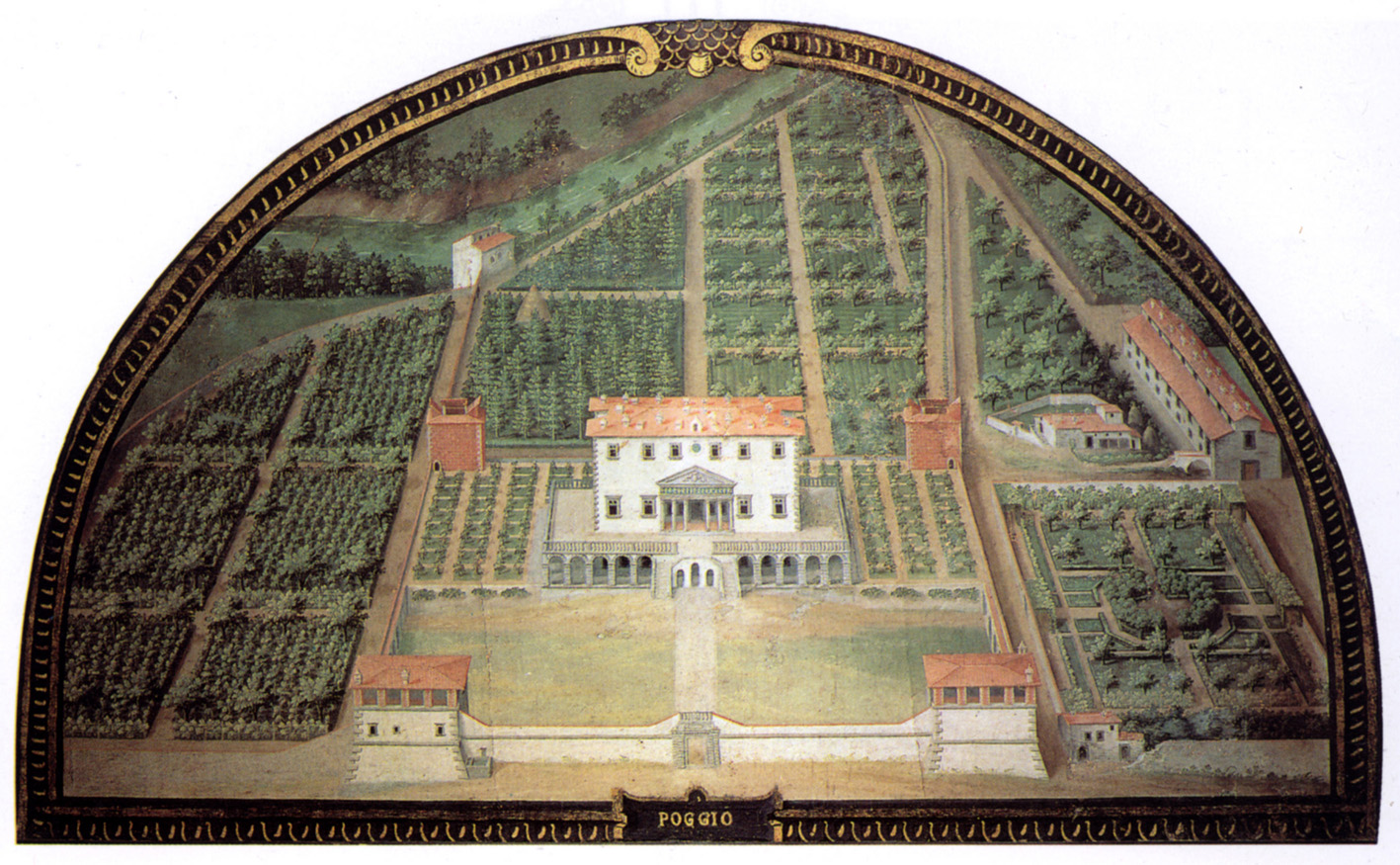
Painting of the Villa Medici di Poggio a Caiano by Giusto Utens

The first Medici villas were the Villa del Trebbio and that at Cafaggiolo, both strong fortified houses built in the 14th century in the Mugello region, the original home of the Medici family. In the 15th century, Cosimo de' Medici built villas designed by Michelozzo at Careggi and Fiesole, still quite severe buildings, but with additional recreational spaces: courtyards, balconies, and gardens. Lorenzo de' Medici spent long periods at the Villa di Careggi. Gradually, Florence became surrounded by a collection of Medici villas, with others in more distant parts of the Grand Duchy of Tuscany. By the end of the 16th century, there were at least 16 major estates, with at least another 11 of secondary interest (mainly agricultural or owned by the Medici family for a short time), together with a constellation of farms and hunting lodges throughout Tuscany. Giusto Utens painted a series of lunettes depicting the main Medici villas in the 17th century, which are now held by the Villa La Petraia.

The last Medici villas were the Villa di Montevettolini and the Villa di Artimino, bought in 1595/6 by Ferdinando I while he was expanding the Villa di Castello, Villa La Petraia and Villa dell'Ambrogiana.

The later villas are outstanding examples of Renaissance and Baroque architecture, and were often accompanied by gardens. The garden at the Villa di Castello, created for Cosimo I de' Medici, Grand Duke of Tuscany, was the first in Italy by Niccolò Tribolo, who later designed the Boboli Gardens for Cosimo's Florentine new residence, the Palazzo Pitti.

Each significant member of the Medici family owned an estate. The Duke moved from house to house. When he was in residence, the villa became a microcosm of the Medici court. For hunting, he could visit the Villa del Trebbio, Villa di Cafaggiolo or Villa di Pratolino; reside at the Villa dell'Ambrogiana in the spring; and move to the Villa di Artimino, to while away the summer in its cooler elevated position.

After the death of Gian Gastone de' Medici in 1737, the Grand Duchy of Tuscany and the Medici's assets, including their villas, were acquired by Francis, Duke of Lorraine (later Holy Roman Emperor). Francis only visited Tuscany once in 1739 and for the next twenty six years the villas were neglected. Consequently when Leopold I inherited the duchy in 1765 many were in a poor state and were disposed of. The remainder continued in use by the Lorraines until 1860 when Tuscany was absorbed into the new Kingdom of Italy. The House of Savoy opted to sell all but two of the remaining Medici villas (La Petraia & Poggio a Caiano), which remained in their possession until the end of the monarchy in 1946. Today, some of the Medici villas are museums; others are occupied by institutions, and a few are owned privately, and often hired privately or used to stage public events.

In 2006, the Italian government submitted the Medici villas for designation by UNESCO as a World Heritage Site. At the 37th UNESCO World Heritage Committee in 2013 at Phnom Penh, "Medici Villas and Gardens in Tuscany" was added to the World Heritage list.

== List ==
=== Villas and gardens on the UNESCO list ===
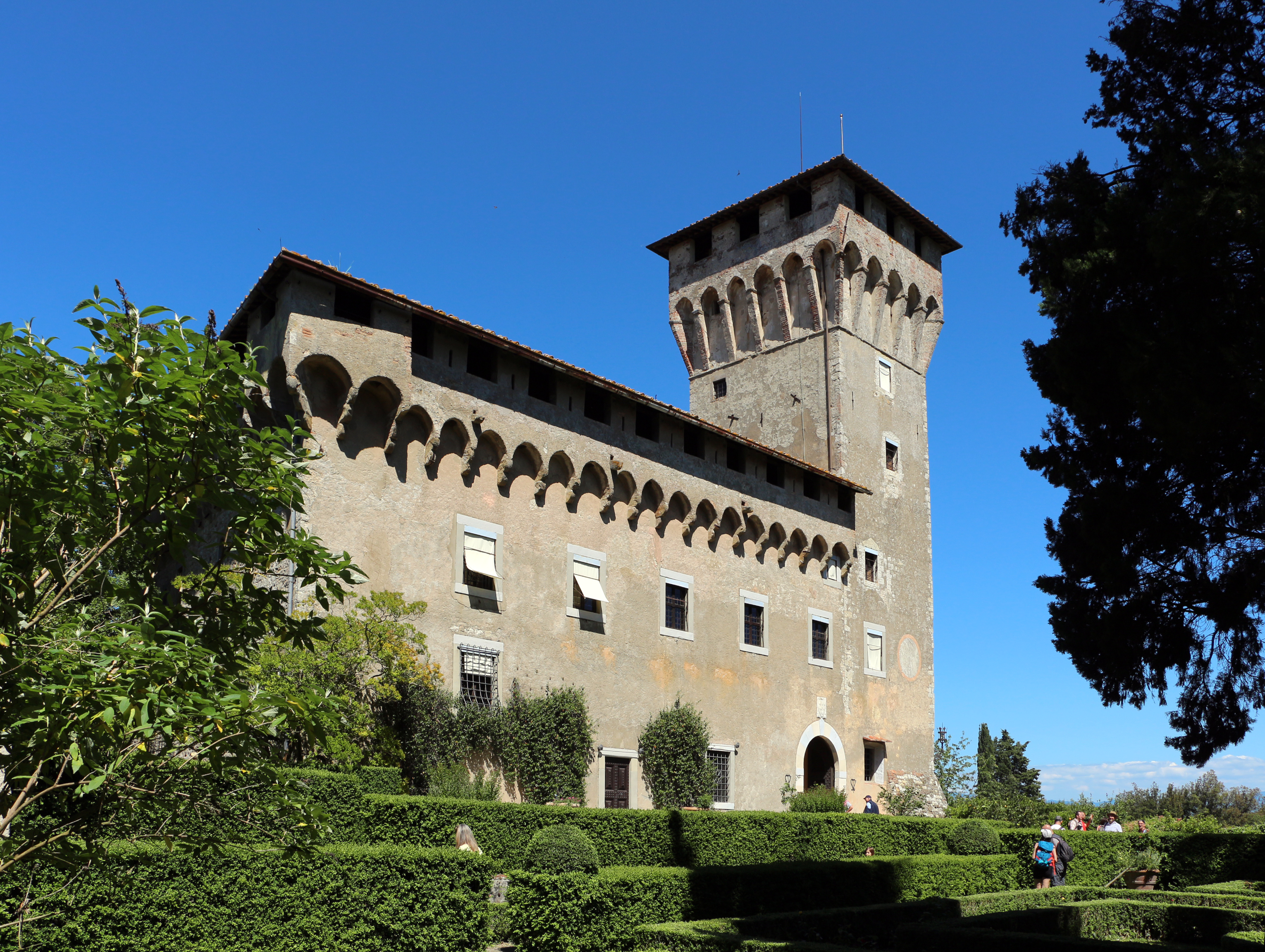
Villa del Trebbio

Twelve villas and two gardens comprise the UNESCO World Heritage Site:

- Boboli Gardens
- Gardens of Pratolino
- Palazzo di Seravezza
- Villa di Artimino
- Villa di Cafaggiolo
- Villa di Careggi
- Villa di Castello
- Villa di Cerreto Guidi
- Villa La Magia
- Villa La Petraia
- Villa Medici in Fiesole
- Villa di Poggio a Caiano
- Villa del Poggio Imperiale
- Villa del Trebbio

=== Major villas ===
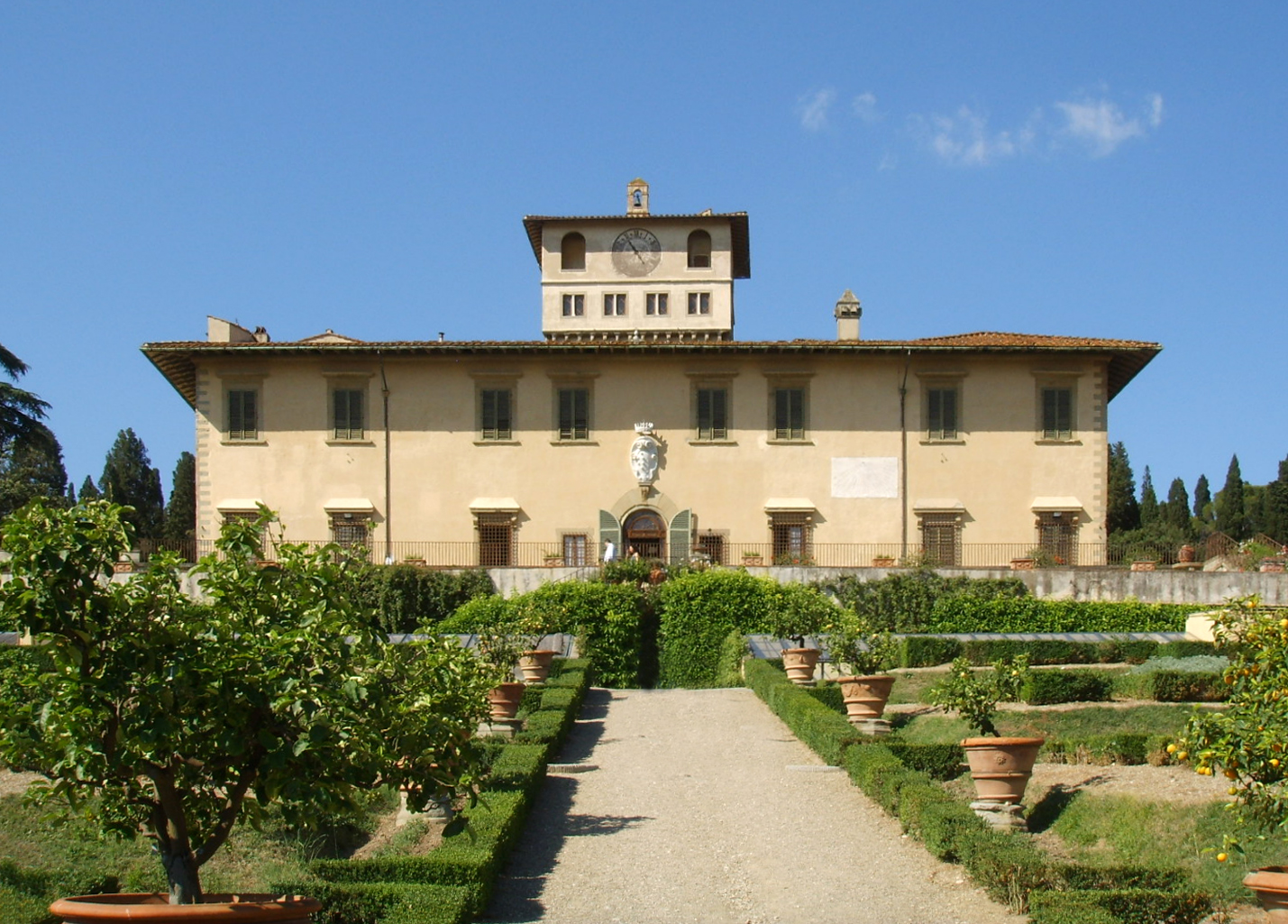
Frontal view of the Villa La Petraia

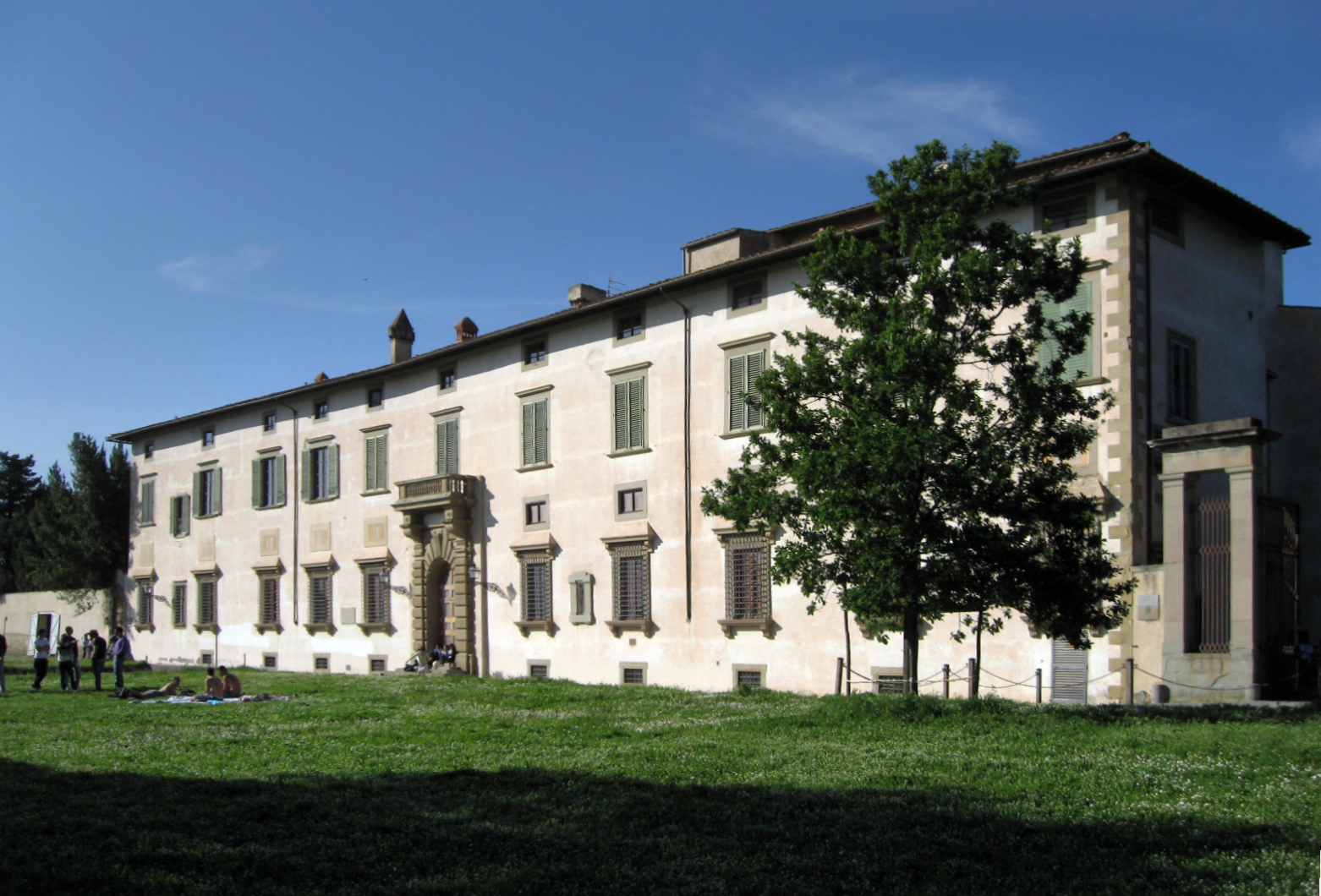
Villa di Castello

1. Villa del Trebbio (mid-14th century–1738)
2. Villa di Cafaggiolo (mid-14th century–1738)
3. Villa di Careggi (1417–1738)
4. Villa Medici in Fiesole (1451–1457)
5. Villa di Poggio a Caiano (1470–1738)
6. Villa di Castello (1480–1738)
7. Villa di Mezzomonte (1480–1482, 1629–1644)
8. Villa La Petraia (first half of the 16th century–1738)
9. Villa di Camugliano (c.1530–1615)
10. Villa di Cerreto Guidi (1555–1738)
11. Villa del Poggio Imperiale (1565–1738)
12. Villa di Pratolino (1568–1738)
13. Villa di Lappeggi (1569–1738)
14. Villa dell'Ambrogiana (1574–1738)
15. Villa La Magia (1583–1738)
16. Villa di Artimino (1596–1738)

=== Minor villas ===
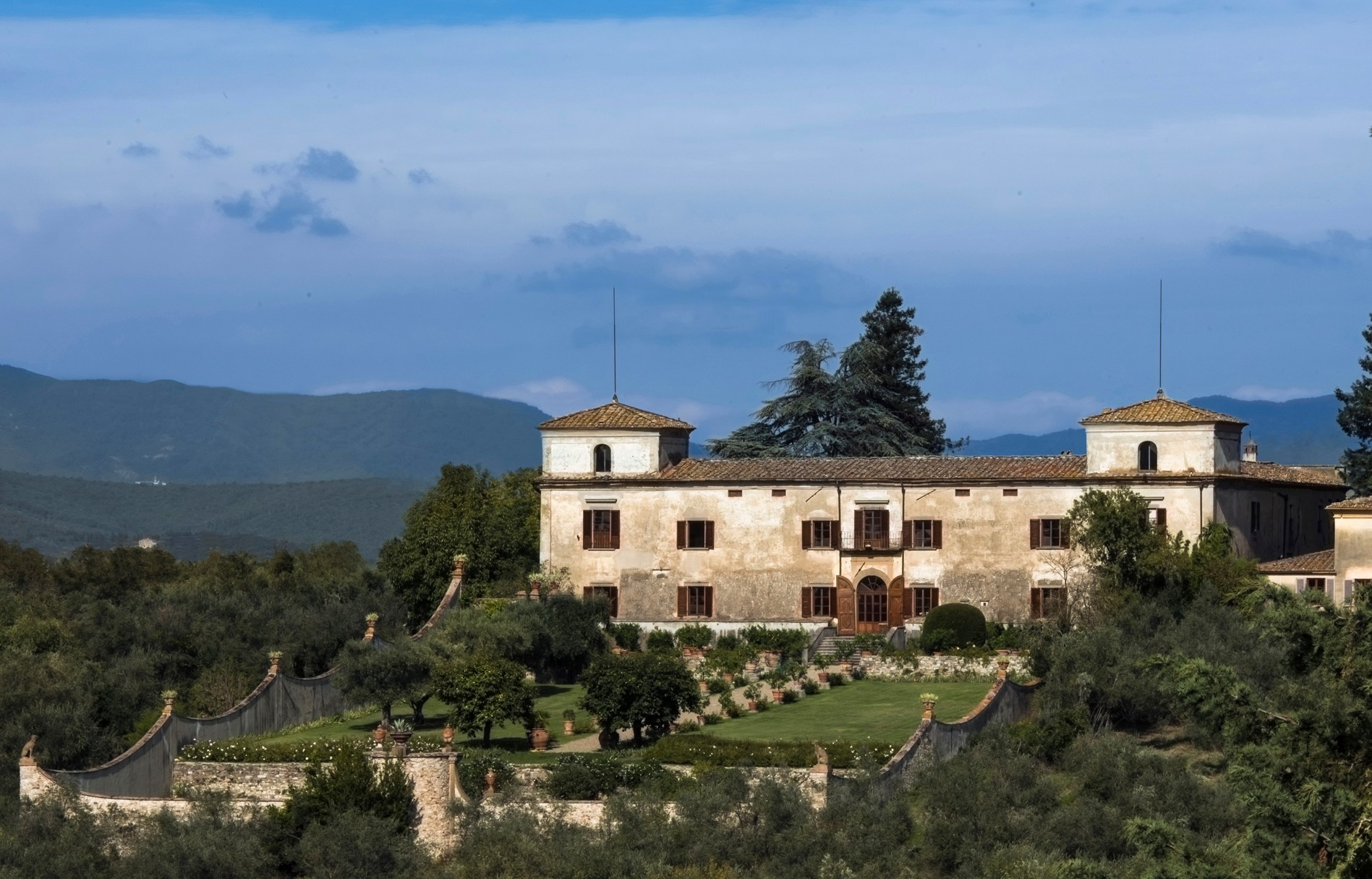
Villa di Lilliano

1. Villa di Collesalvetti (1464–1738)
2. Villa di Agnano (1486–1498)
3. Villa di Arena Metato (c.1563–1738)
4. Villa di Spedaletto (1486–1492)
5. Villa di Stabbia (1548–1738)
6. Villa della Topaia (c.1550–1738)
7. Palazzo di Seravezza (1560–1738)
8. Villa di Marignolle (1560–1621)
9. Villa di Lilliano (1584–1738)
10. Villa di Coltano (1586–1738)
11. Villa di Montevettolini (c.1595–1738)

== Gallery ==
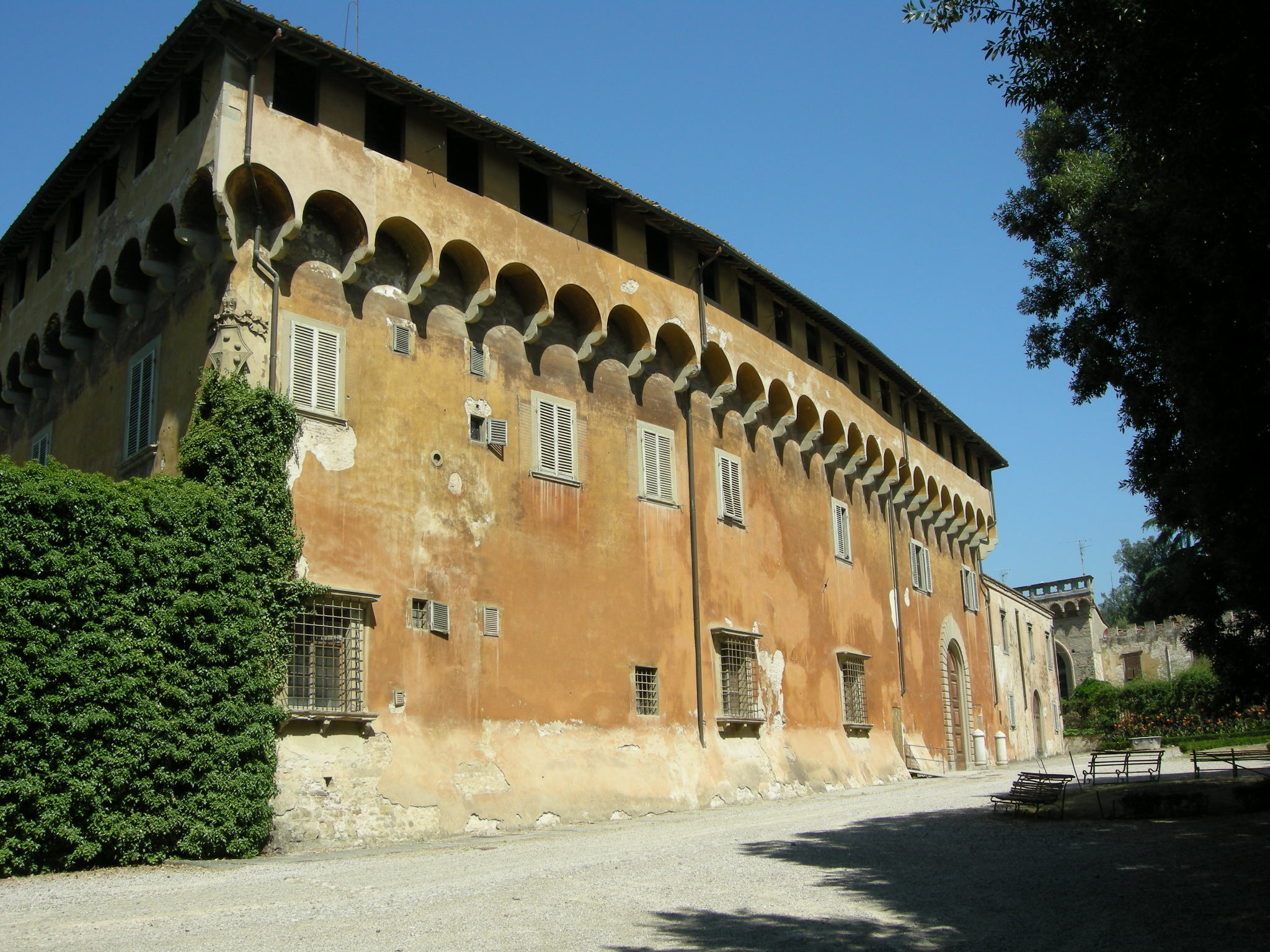
Villa di Careggi

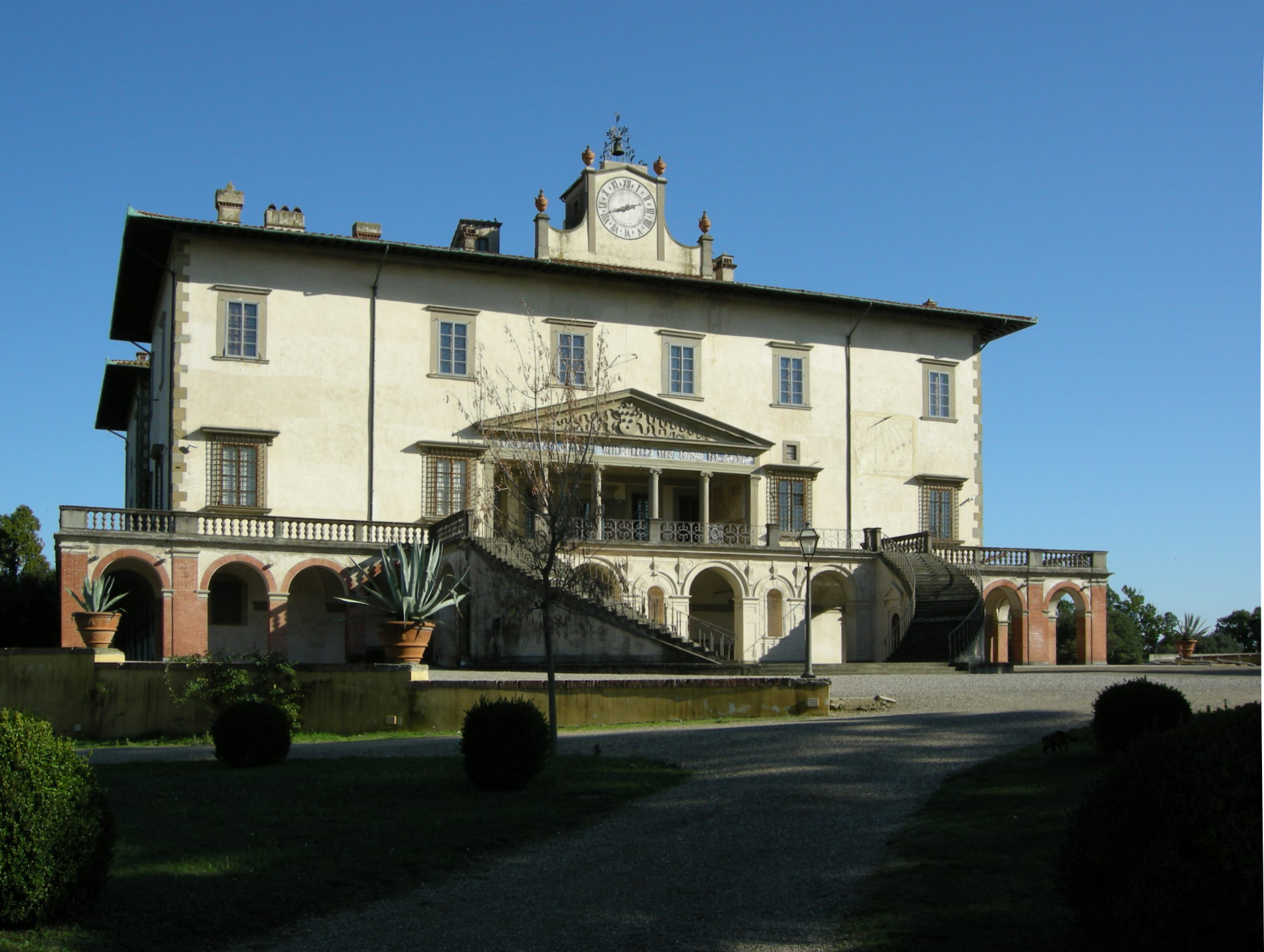
Villa di Poggio a Caiano

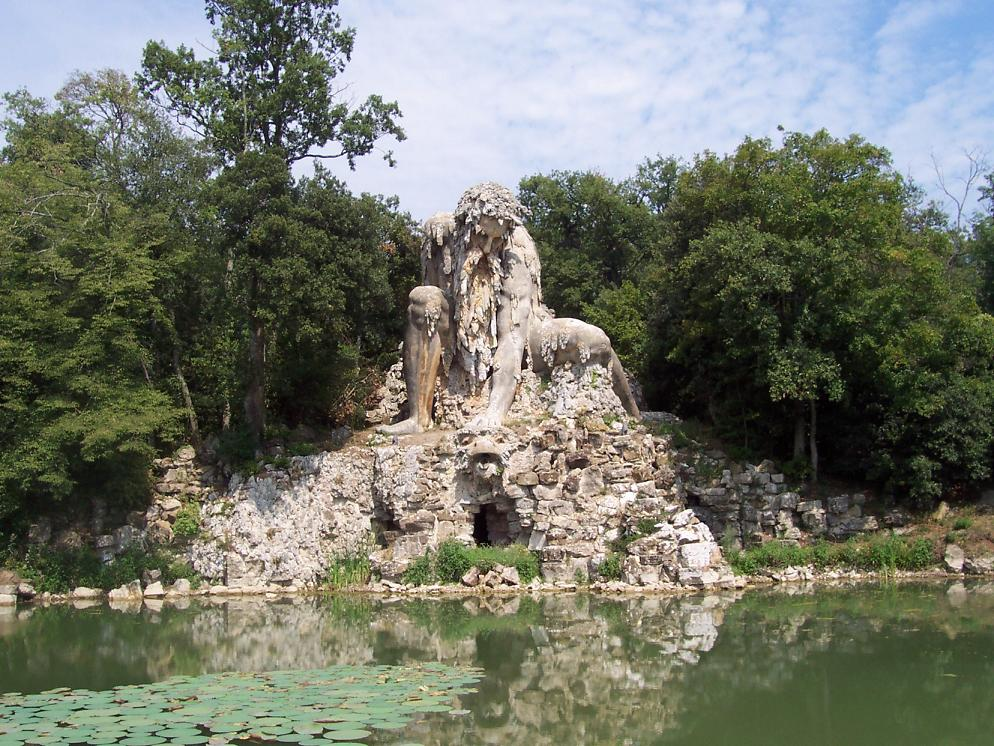
L'Appennino, Parco di Pratolino

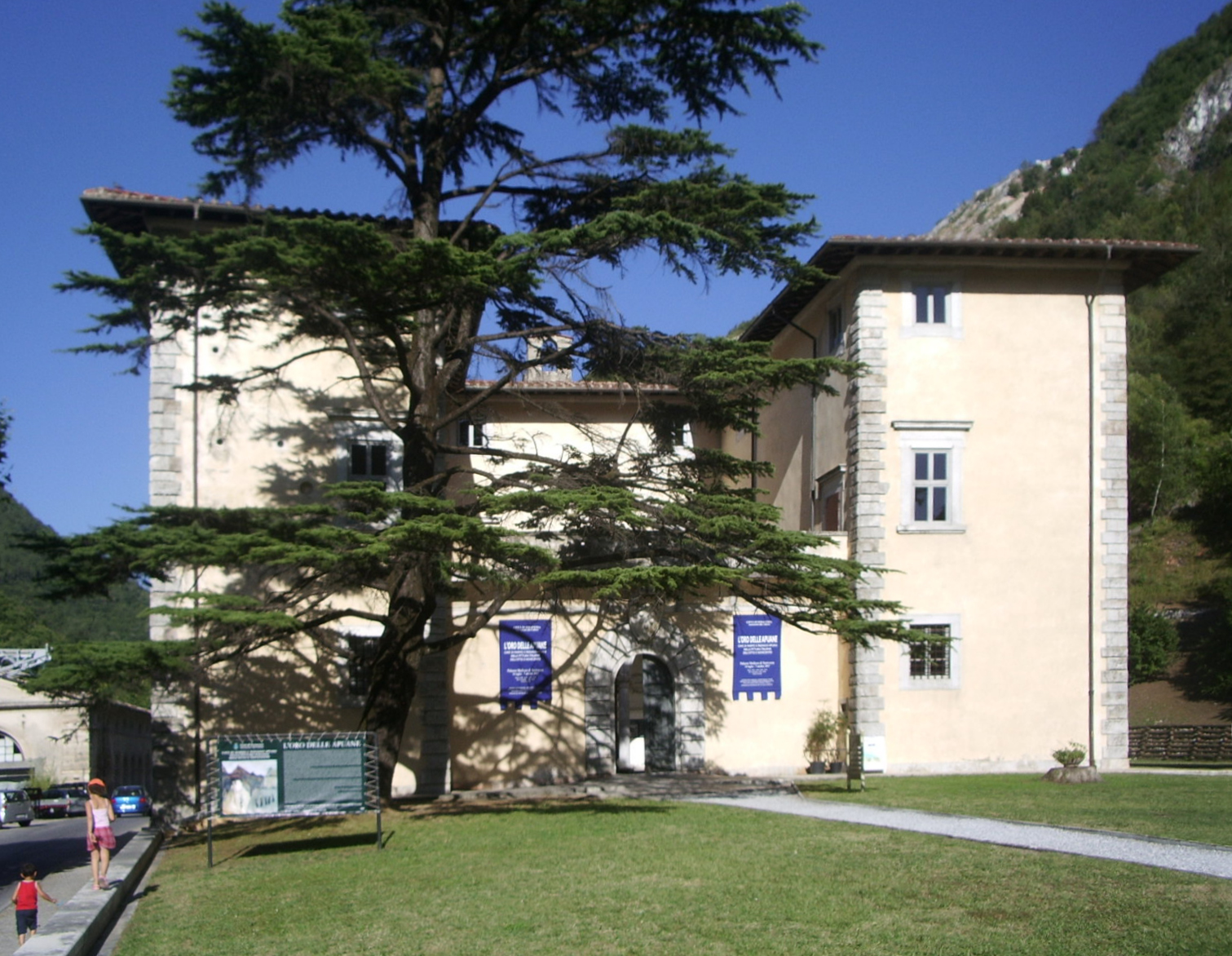
Palazzo di Seravezza

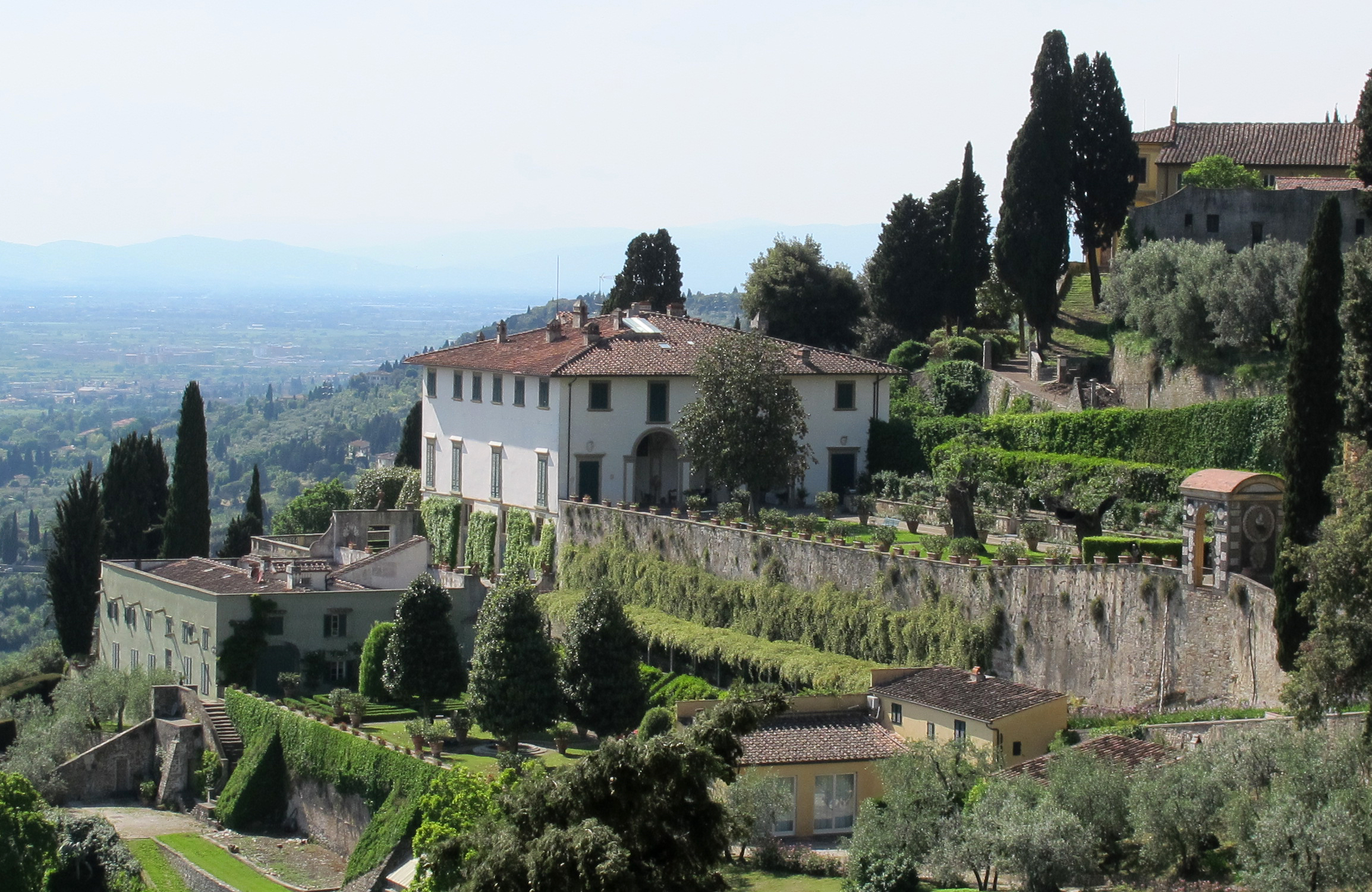
Villa a Fiesole

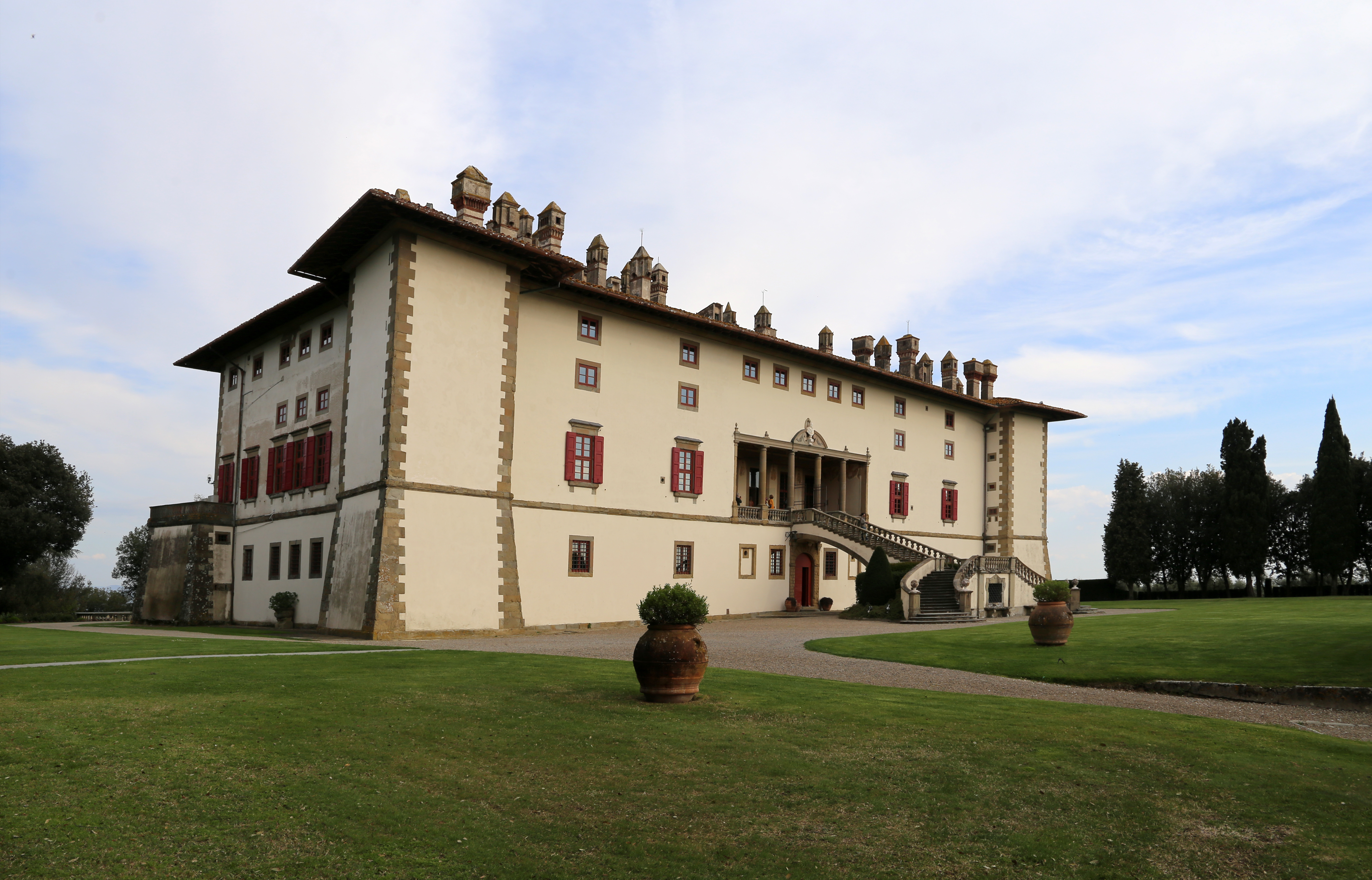
Villa di Artimino

In addition to their country villas, the Medici also occupied the following buildings in Florence:

- Palazzo Medici Riccardi (1444–1540, then used by less important members of the family until 1659)
- Palazzo Vecchio (1540–c.1560)
- Palazzo Pitti (1550–1738)
- Casino di San Marco

and the Villa Medici in Rome.
