= Villa del Trebbio =

UNESCO World Heritage Site
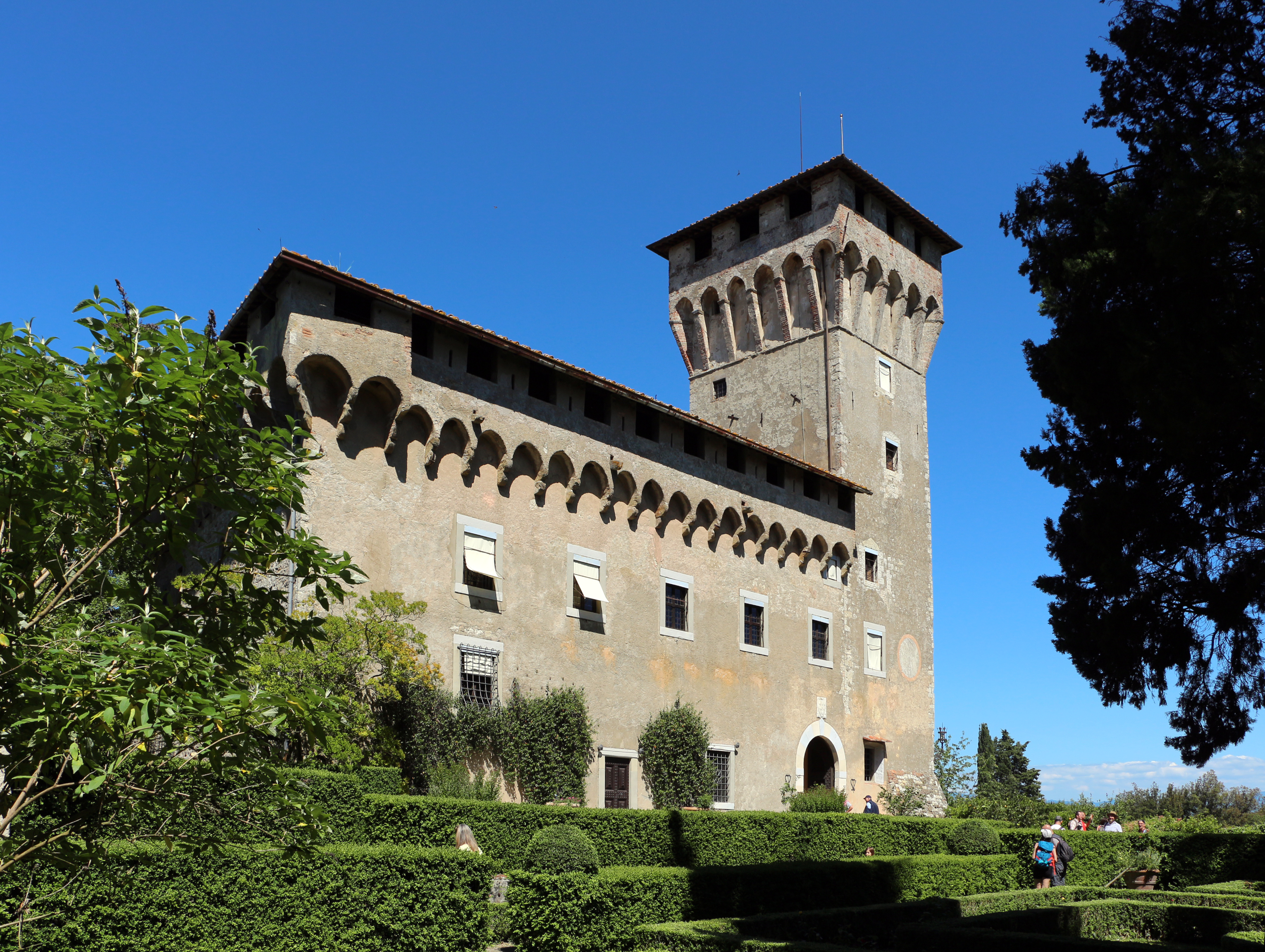

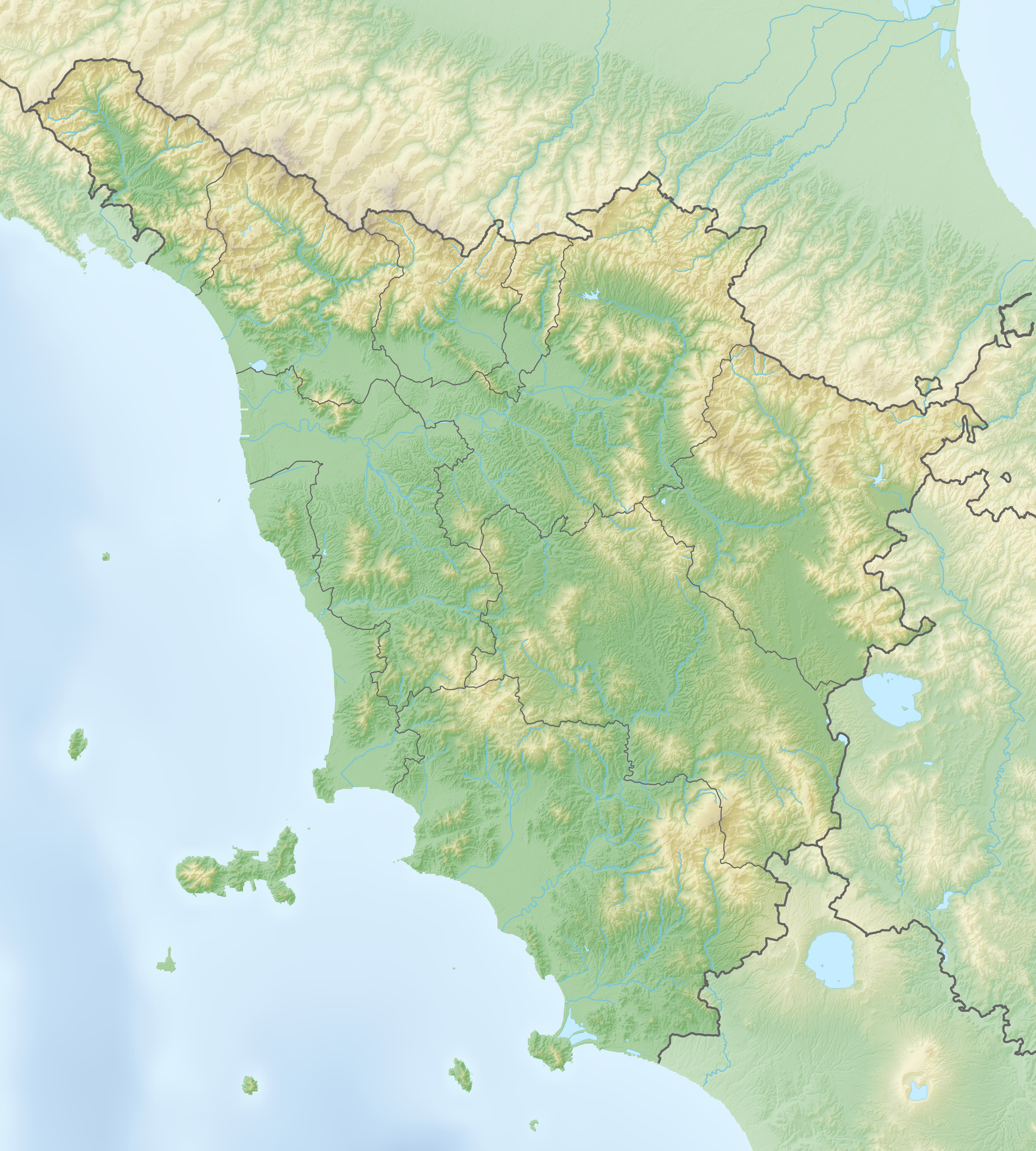
- Location within Tuscany Location within Italy
- Official name: Villa del Trebbio
- Location: San Piero a Sieve, Tuscany, Italy
- Criteria: Cultural
- Endangered: No
- Coordinates: 43°57′11″N 11°17′12″E

The Villa del Trebbio is a Medici villa in San Piero a Sieve, Tuscany, Italy.

== Description ==
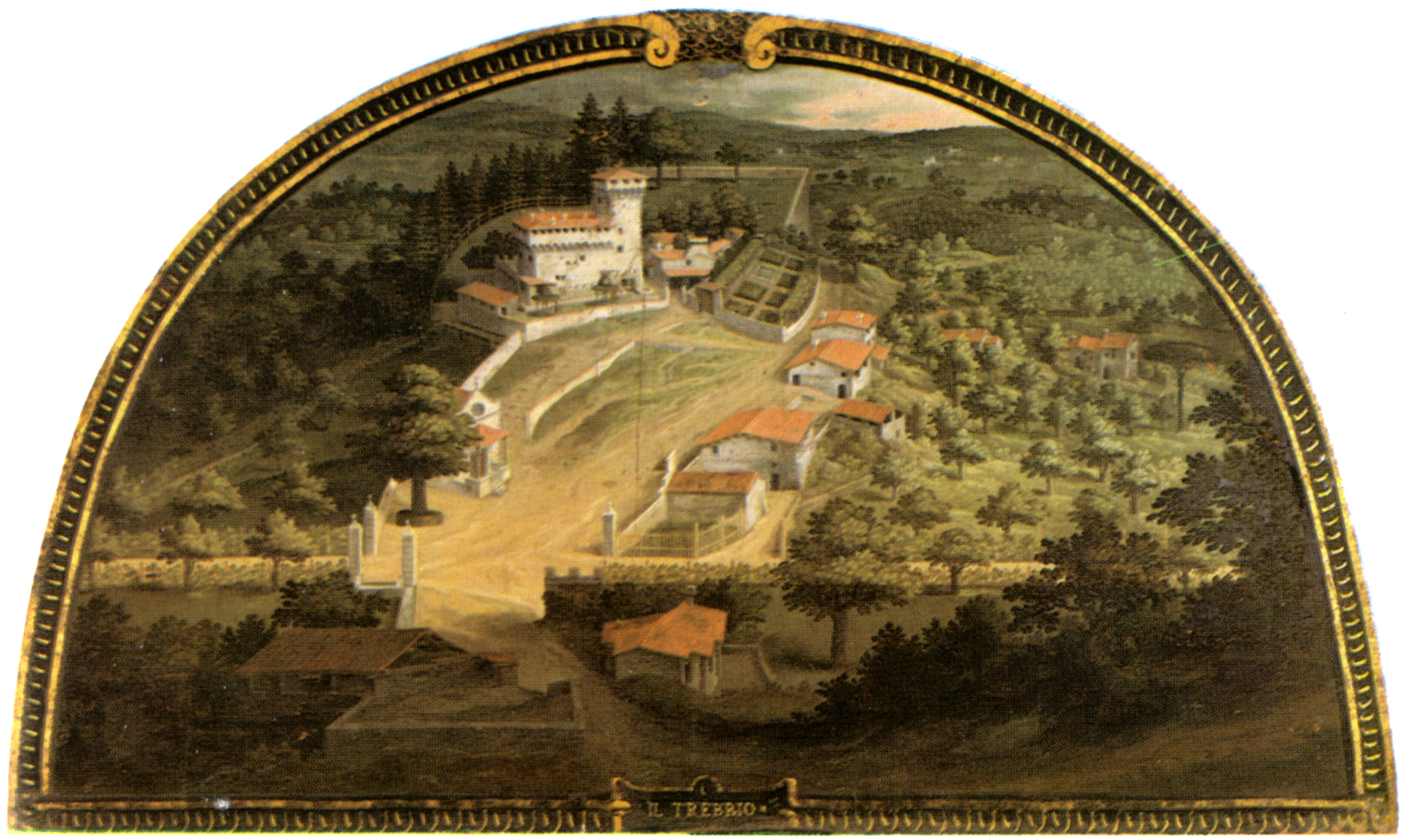
The Villa del Trebbio, in a lunette by Giusto Utens, held in the villa Medicea della Petraia.

The villa is located near San Piero a Sieve in the Mugello region, in the province of Florence, in the area from which the Medici family originated. It was one of the first - if not the first - of the Medici villas built outside Florence. The estate is situated on a strategic position in the Apennines, on the top of a hill dominating the Val di Sieve, near a crossroads (giving rise to its name, from the Latin trivium).

The villa belonged to Giovanni di Bicci de' Medici, the founder of the Medici bank and of the fortunes of the Medici family. Following his death in 1429, it was remodelled by his son, Cosimo de' Medici, whose architect, Michelozzo, restyled it as a fortified castle. Michelozzo retained the windowless tower, moat and drawbridge, and added a perimeter walkway with corbels. There is a central courtyard with a well.

The villa remained essentially a fortified house, but various features indicate its secondary purpose as a place of pleasure, including an early walled garden, built on two terraces beside the villa. The upper terrace has a stone pergola, with a double row of columns; a similar pergola has disappeared from the lower terrace. The garden was a place of retreat for Cosimo, away from the troubles of politics in Florence, where he could tend his fruit trees.

On the other side of the villa stands a chapel. The villa was surrounded by woods and an agricultural estate, bordering that of the Villa Medicea di Cafaggiolo.

In the sixteenth century the villa was enlarged by Cosimo I de' Medici, Grand Duke of Tuscany, who enjoyed hunting in the estate, and his son Ferdinand I. Ferdinand II sold the estate to a wealthy Florentine, Giuliano Serragli, in 1644, who gave it to the Oratorians.

The garden to the front of the villa, with roses and box hedges, was laid out in the twentieth century.

As of 2008, it belongs to a private individual who uses the property to produce fine wines. Wine tasting and tours are available to interested groups in English and Italian.
