= San Piero a Sieve =

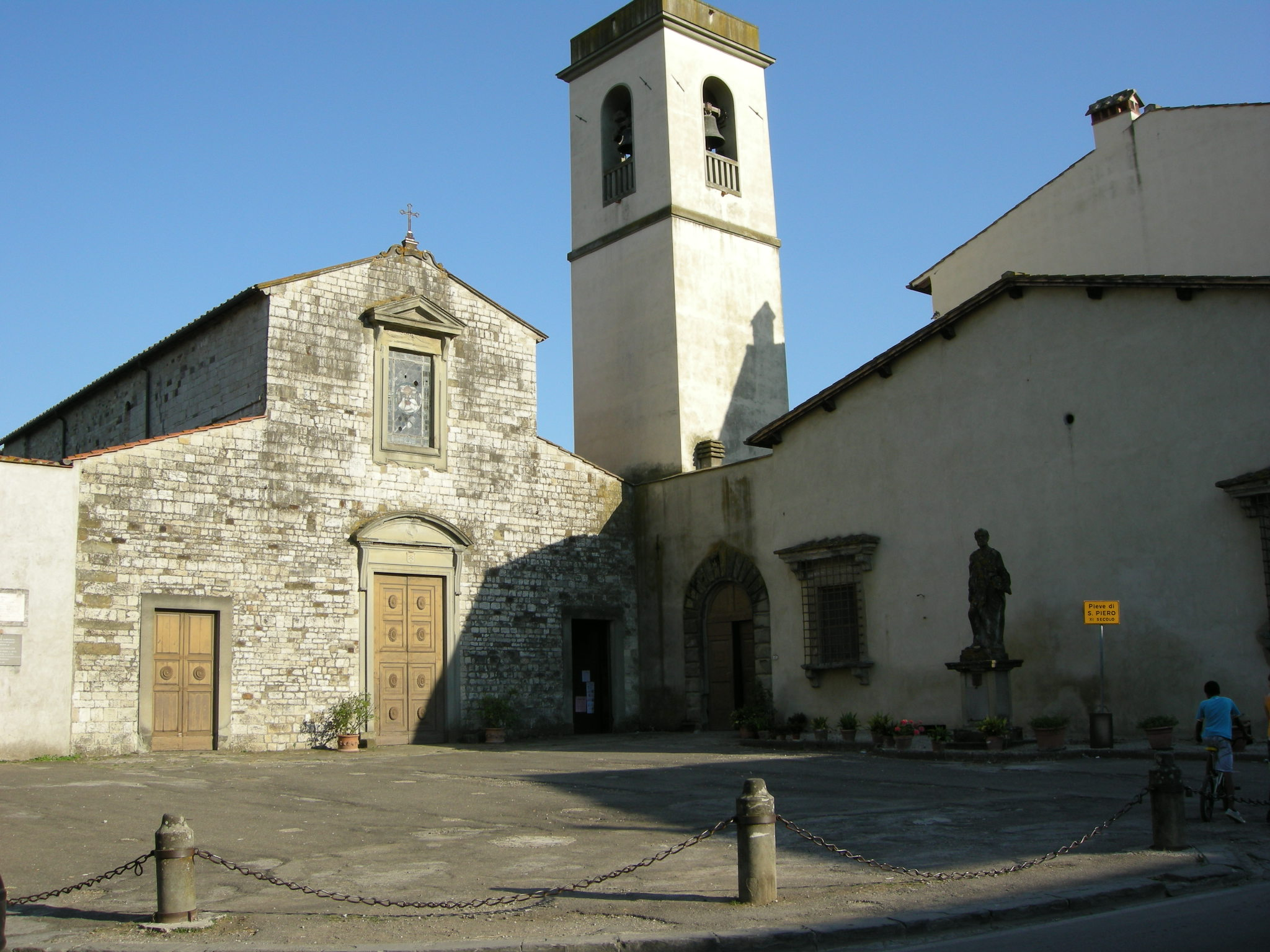
- The pieve of San Pietro
- Interactive map of San Piero a Sieve
- Coordinates: 43°57′36″N 11°19′18″E
- Country: Italy
- Region: Tuscany
- Comune: Scarperia e San Piero
- City: Metropolitan City of Florence

Area
  - Total: 36 km^{2} (14 sq mi)
- Elevation: 212 m (696 ft)

Population (15 May 2019)
  - Total: 3,758
- Demonym: Sanpierini
- Postal code: 50037
- Area code: 055
- Website: https://www.comune.scarperiaesanpiero.fi.it/it

San Piero a Sieve is an urban centre and of the comune (municipality) of Scarperia e San Piero, located in the Metropolitan City of Florence, in Tuscany, Italy. It was an Italian municipality, with a population of 4,065 in 2010, until 1 January 2014, when it was merged with Scarperia to form the new Municipality of Scarperia e San Piero. In the territory of San Piero a Sieve is located the Villa del Trebbio, since 2013 on the UNESCO World Heritage List. The village is about 20 kilometres (12 mi) north of Florence.

== Geography ==
- Seismic classification: zone 2 (medium-high seismicity), since the Ordinanza PCM 3274 of 20 March 2003
- Climatic classification: zone E, 2151 GG
- Atmospheric diffusivity: medium, Ibimet CNR 2002

== History ==
‘Where the lowermost gorge of the Carza closes in between the slopes of Poggio del Trebbio and Monte Cacioli, it opens into a marvellous amphitheatre of hills and on a more distant open horizon the unity of the ridge of the Apennines is outlined and the Sieve valley widens to the east; at the confluence of the Carza and the Sieve the village of San Piero a Sieve rises’.

(Francesco Niccolai, 1914)

=== From Prehistory to the Etruscans ===
The oldest traces of human presence in the San Piero area go back to the Middle Palaeolithic. In the localities of Lucigliano, Toro, Le Mozzete and San Giusto a Fortuna, numerous flint stone tools, such as spear points, scrapers, etc., have been found.

The most important archaeological finds, however, are those related to the presence of the Etruscans, which witness the presence of a society already organised in stable settlements of an urban nature. One of the most important signs of the Etruscan presence in San Piero is the archaic tomb of Le Mozzete (datable between the 7th and 6th centuries B.C.), of which only some enormous stones now remain visible, and the extraordinary discovery in the locality of Monti of a series of tombs excavated in the shape of wells organised like a proper necropolis (7th century B.C.).

Subsequent Roman colonisation left a diffuse presence in the area, testified to by place names and archaeological finds.

=== Middle Ages and the Medici's Family ===
The village of San Piero a Sieve originated as a road junction near the ancient bridge over the Sieve river that led across the ancient road (derived from the Roman route of the Flaminia Militare) that crossed the Apennines to the Osteria Bruciata Pass. It is this, the fact that it has always been a very important road junction, that characterises the history of the town in Mugello. In fact, its importance derives from the postal road that crossed it until the 18th century and was the only one that led from Florence to Bologna. So, returning to the origins, the first urban agglomerate developed in the 11th century (although the presence of a watchtower where Villa Schifanoia stands today and of a village/castle around it is probable that it had already been present for a couple of centuries), near the bridge over the Sieve, after the construction of the plebeian church of San Pietro and took the name ‘Villa’. In the following century, on 17 October 1105, it took the name ‘Villa Sevae’, as can be deduced from a ‘judicial act’ drawn up in the presence of Countess Matilda. The definitive name of San Piero a Sieve appears to have been given in 1117, combining the name of the village with that of the Pieve. Originally, San Piero a Sieve belonged to the powerful feudal family of the Ubaldini da Coldaia. The community's economy was exclusively rural. The presence of a market for livestock favoured the passage and permanence of people in these places and developed in the inhabitants an attitude of exchange, confrontation and dialogue that will remain and grow stronger over time to the present day.

Subsequently, the Medici took possession of the entire area. This happened in the context of a precise political-administrative project of an expansive nature that saw, first the Florentine Republic and then the Medici, initiate a process aimed at extending control over the entire countryside to be able to exercise control over the main communication routes, which were in the possession of the great feudal families (such as the Ubaldini and the Guidi for what concerns Mugello) that until then ruled the Apennines.

The impulse that the Medici gave to the development of this land is remarkable. Certainly, when they decided to return to the green valley of Mugello, they were also responding to a natural feeling. It is in fact common opinion to affirm, obeying an ancient custom, that the Medici were born in Mugello, even though there is no document that confirms this. Moreover, the fact that they returned to live in Mugello, almost as if they wanted to breathe the air of their ancestors, and that they built villas and fortresses there, once they had consolidated their economic and political power, may lead one to believe that it is likely that the Medici were actually coal merchants in Campiano, a small hamlet in the hills, close to the plain of Cafaggiolo, where Cosimo il Vecchio later had the architect Michelozzo Michelozzi build his famous villa. However, there is no information on who was the first to move from the countryside to Florence. The village of San Piero a Sieve received a considerable boost in relation to the operosity of the Medici: it grew larger and gained a certain importance in the political framework of the Mugello, also marking an increase in population. The transit of an ever-increasing number of people made it necessary to build structures for reception and hospitality. Precisely for this reason, a ‘hospitale’ was created in 1275 overlooking the piazza della Pieve, in the village, by ‘presbiter Gianbonus’, as can be seen from the written plaque left during construction. Other ‘spedali’ were built along the road at Novoli, in 1335, and at Tagliaferro, this last one flanked by an hotel.

A work of strategic value for the later history of the community is the construction of the bridge over the Sieve river. The bridge, one of the oldest on this river, was built by the famous Florentine master masons: Niccolò di Ciardo, Francesco Carletti and Giovanni Mercati. Finally, San Piero a Sieve could rely on a safe stone bridge to replace the one in wood and stone that had until then guaranteed the passage of the river. With this event, San Piero a Sieve consolidated its function as a market and resting place for travellers, traders and pilgrims. Being then located on a postal road consolidated this role. It is an established fact of historiography the importance of this type of road for the communities affected by it. The Florence-Bologna, passing through the Giogo Pass, was considered a postal road and remained so until the opening of the new Futa route (1759). This connection was of primary importance for the exchange between the two inter-Apennine regions. The journey between the two towns required at least two days' riding and included a stop with an exchange of horses at San Piero a Sieve, facilitating trade, commerce and business.

Between the 14th and 15th centuries, San Piero a Sieve experienced its moment of greatest prestige, naturally in relation to the successes of Medici policy. It was during this period that they erected villas and castles. Evidence of the Florentine bankers' family's interest can be seen in the impulse they gave to a pottery factory in Cafaggiolo, with a furnace and farmhouse for the managers, which became very famous at the time, due to the quality and quantity of the product. It must be said that the inhabitants of San Piero a Sieve always reciprocated with loyalty the Medici's commitment to their land. In 1351 they collaborated with Giovanni Visconti da Oleggio at the siege of Scarperia. Later, they joyfully welcomed the return of the Medici to the Florentine Seignory: ‘O Mugellans hear; they ring the bells with joy: returned are the cunning Medici, our increase and honour!’, sang the villagers. At the end of the 14th century, San Piero a Sieve was also placed at the head of the Tagliaferro League, which united all the peoples of the surrounding area, including that of Vaglia with the Pieve di San Cresci in Macioli.

In San Piero, Bernadetto de' Medici, Lorenzo's cousin, also had some dwellings under Schifanoia, which are still recognisable today but have been altered several times and reduced to anonymity. Later in the village, Michele del Tavolaccino, known as Scoronconcolo, was born and lived there. Lorenzino de‘ Medici hired Scoronconcolo as to assassinate the first Duke of Florence, Alessandro de’ Medici, the latter's cousin, with a knife.

=== From 15th to the 19th century ===
Towards the end of the 15th century, in connection with a momentary lack of interest on the part of the Medici in their possessions in Mugello, a period of decline began and in 1551 the League of Tagliaferro was also placed under the Vicariate of Scarperia. The only moment of rebirth for the village was when Cosimo I de' Medici decided to build the largest Medici fortress on the hill of San Martino overlooking the town. From 1569 until 1608, the great work gave work to many villagers and several brickworks were formed throughout the countryside for the manufacture of bricks.

With the fall of the Medici in the 17th century, the village of San Piero a Sieve also experienced a long period of socio-economic stagnation, also due to the passage of the Grand Duchy first to the Habsburg-Lorraine and then to the French with the conquest by Napoleon. With the French, the Grand Duchy saw its flourishing economy from the Lorraine period collapse, and the entire Mugello valley also experienced a long period of stagnation.

=== From 19th century to the present ===
With the return of the Lorraines and the restoration of the Grand Duchy, the economy also began to flourish again, and with Grand Duke Leopold II of Tuscany, the entire territory enjoyed a period of growth thanks to the construction and completion of the Muraglione Pass and Futa Pass roads. In addition, the Grand Duke began the Faentina railway project, which would be built about half a century later.

The village of San Piero also saw great changes in this period. The most important was the construction of the Via Provinciale that was to replace the old Via della Posta, narrow and very uphill in some parts. With the construction of the new road, very wide to allow the passage of all types of vehicles and completely flat, the old medieval bridge was also demolished and a much larger and more solid one rebuilt, also to resist the frequent flooding of the Sieve river. For this reason, the Via Provinciale and the axis that joined it leading to Barberino di Mugello were later raised to form embankments to defend the lower part of the town from flooding.

Economically, San Piero saw a great rebirth at the end of the 19th century, when, with the construction of the railway station, the first trains arrived, favouring the circulation of people and goods. In this regard, it can be said that, along the entire Florence-Faenza route, San Piero a Sieve was one of the most significant stations, to which the citizens of Barberino, Scarperia and Firenzuola belonged. A large store for goods was built adjacent to the station and the largest cheese factory in the area was also built.

During the 19th century, two personalities lived in San Piero who went on to become famous in 19th century Italy. The first was Count Luigi Guglielmo Cambray-Digny, owner of the Villa di Schifanoia and the adjacent farm. With him, a great scholar of agricultural practices, the farm became the agricultural nerve centre, not only of San Piero but of the entire Mugello: he greatly improved the conditions of sharecroppers and even had a farm tool factory built near the village. He was later Minister of Agriculture, Industry and Commerce in his first term, Minister of Finance in his second and then finally Senator. In San Piero he held the office of Gonfaloniere (during the Grand Duchy) and Mayor until almost his death.

The other was Pietro Cipriani, who was born in the village. He was a great doctor and university lecturer even at a young age during the Grand Duchy. A scholar of the cholera that afflicted many cities in those years, he directed many hospitals in Tuscany and Italy in general during these epidemics. He had a very active political career, especially during the Risorgimento and was later made a senator during the reign. The house where he was born is marked today by a plaque. It is located in Piazza Colonna where the Casa del Popolo stands in the ‘Palazzo Cipriani’.

During the last century, San Piero a Sieve suffered the effects and consequences of the two world wars like the other Mugello municipalities. San Piero a Sieve was the birthplace of Francesco Giunta, a notorious fascist hierarch, inventor of the border squadrism, Secretary of the National Fascist Party, Undersecretary to the Presidency of the Council of Ministers between 1927 and 1932 and Governor of Dalmatia in 1943. The participation of its citizens in the Resistance was active, as evidenced by the memories that the protagonists left us.

== Coat of arms ==
The coat of arms of the municipality of San Piero a Sieve was conceded by decree of the President of the Republic on 27 July 1987.^{[1]}

Azure, the two keys of St. Peter's, placed in decussion, the silver key in band, the golden key, crossing, in bar, with the wits at the bottom, tied by a red cord, placed in a triangle, with the heads joined by the bow at the bottom, of the same, these keys surmounted by the papal tiara in silver, with the three crowns and the golden cross, with the infulae hanging in band and bar, in gold, edged in silver. Municipal external ornaments.

The municipal gonfalon was a drape of white.

== Main sights ==
Churces and religious sights

- The Bosco ai Frati monastery was most probably founded by the Ubaldini in the 6th century, then became the cenoby of the Basilians in the 11th century; later, until 1206, it was occupied by some hermits and then donated, together with a large part of the wood, to St Francis of Assisi (the Franciscans entered the monastery in 1212). Here lived, among others, the Venerable Giovanni da Perugia known as Lo Scalzo, Vicar General at the time of St Francis, and Father Benedetto da Gavorraccio. In 1349, theconvent was almost completely abandoned due to the plague and only flourished again in 1420 when Cosimo I il Vecchio bought it and rebuilt it; He had the refectory enlarged, the bell tower, the cloister, the sacristy, the cistern and the loggia erected, this last according to a design by Michelozzo, who modified the church of San Bonaventura da Bagnoregio, included in the convent, equipping it with a columned portico on the outside; on the inside, however, he embellished the single nave with cross vaults and enlarged the polygonal choir. In front of this is a 17th-century wooden dossal, inlaid with gold, bearing the Medici coat of arms.
- The most important religious monument for the community of San Piero a Sieve is the Pieve di San Pietro, located in the centre of the village, next to the Cardetole Bridge over the Carza river. The facade of the Pieve overlooks a small square, where a statue of St. Peter by Girolamo Ticciati stands. The parish church has three entrance doors and one bears the date of restoration in 1776; it was rebuilt by the priest Leonardo di Bernardo de' Medici, bishop of Forlì, and has a 16th-century style. In 1906, the square-shaped bell tower, built in 1607, was rebuilt. The parish church is in filaret, raised in the central part and inside it has three naves, five round arches, supported by five quadrangular pillars: the doubt remains as to whether the arches were supported by the pillars or by columns concealed within them, since the pieve underwent restoration work, during which, among other things, the floor was raised and vaults were built for the roof. The apse was also demolished and replaced by a rectangular tribune, leaving traces of the old construction, however, that hint at its ancient origin. The baptismal font in glazed terracotta from the School of Giovanni della Robbia, (c. 1508) is six-sided, with paintings depicting the life of St. John the Baptist and Medici coats of arms on the corners.
- Inside the church of San Niccolò a Spugnole there is a painting from the first half of the 14th century, depicting the Holy Mary, celebrated for the Ascension, located on the main altar.
- The church of San Giusto in Fortuna held a glazed terracotta attributed to Rossellino, the Virgin and Child, which was brought to the Museo Nazionale del Bargello in Florence. The territory of Fortuna belonged to the Florentine bishops.
- The church of Santo Stefano in Cornetole is recorded as far back as 1123, although it was rebuilt in 1840–1850. Its patrons were the Pitti-Gaddi and later the Medici.
- The church of Sant'Jacopo a Coldaia was under the patronage of the Ubaldini until the 11th century, then belonged to the Medici until 1835; it preserves a painting whose subjects reveal the delicacy of the features, the Virgin and Child with three figures of saints in the background. This painting was kept in the old church of San Niccolò, which was located near the church of San Jacopo a Coldaia.
- The church of San Lorenzo a Gabbiano belonged to the Vallombrosian friars in the 13th century and was used as a hospice; in 1632, a Vallombrosian friar built the priors' tombs there and rebuilt the high altar in stone. In this church is a painting by Jacopo Vignali, Madonna and Child with Saints. Near the church is the Villa La Quiete.
- The church of San Michele a Lucigliano dates back to 1353 and was under the patronage of the Bettini family at this time. In 1787, it was enlarged with the annexation of the church of Santa Maria a Soli.
