= Convent of Bosco ai Frati =

Religious building in Scarperia e San Piero, Italy

Coordinates: 43.9862°N 11.3039°E

The Convent of Bosco ai Frati is located in the comune (municipality) of Scarperia e San Piero, in the midst of Turkey oak woods. The area is in the province of Florence in the Italian region Tuscany, and is situated about 25 kilometres (16 miles) northeast of Florence.

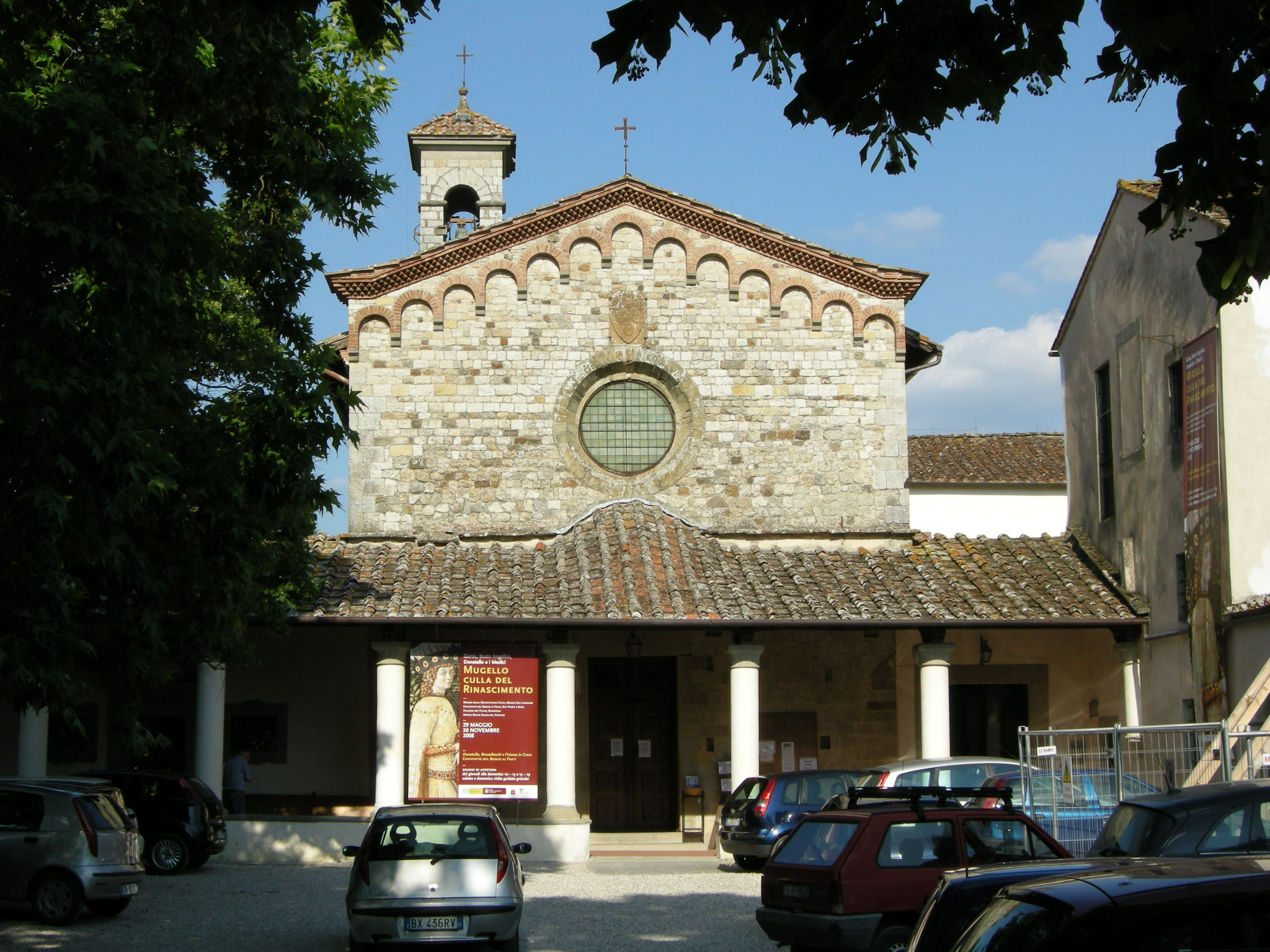
Convent of Bosco ai Frati

== History and description ==
The convent was most probably founded by the Ubaldini, a local noble family possibly of Lombard origins, in the sixth century, then became a monastery of the Basilians in the ninth century. At some point it came to be occupied by a group of hermits, until 1206, when it was donated with a large part of the wood, to Saint Francis di Assisi. The Franciscans occupied the convent in 1212. Among those who lived there was the Venerable Giovanni da Perugia (John of Perugia), known as Lo Scalzo (the Barefooted), Vicar General of the Order in the time of St Francis.

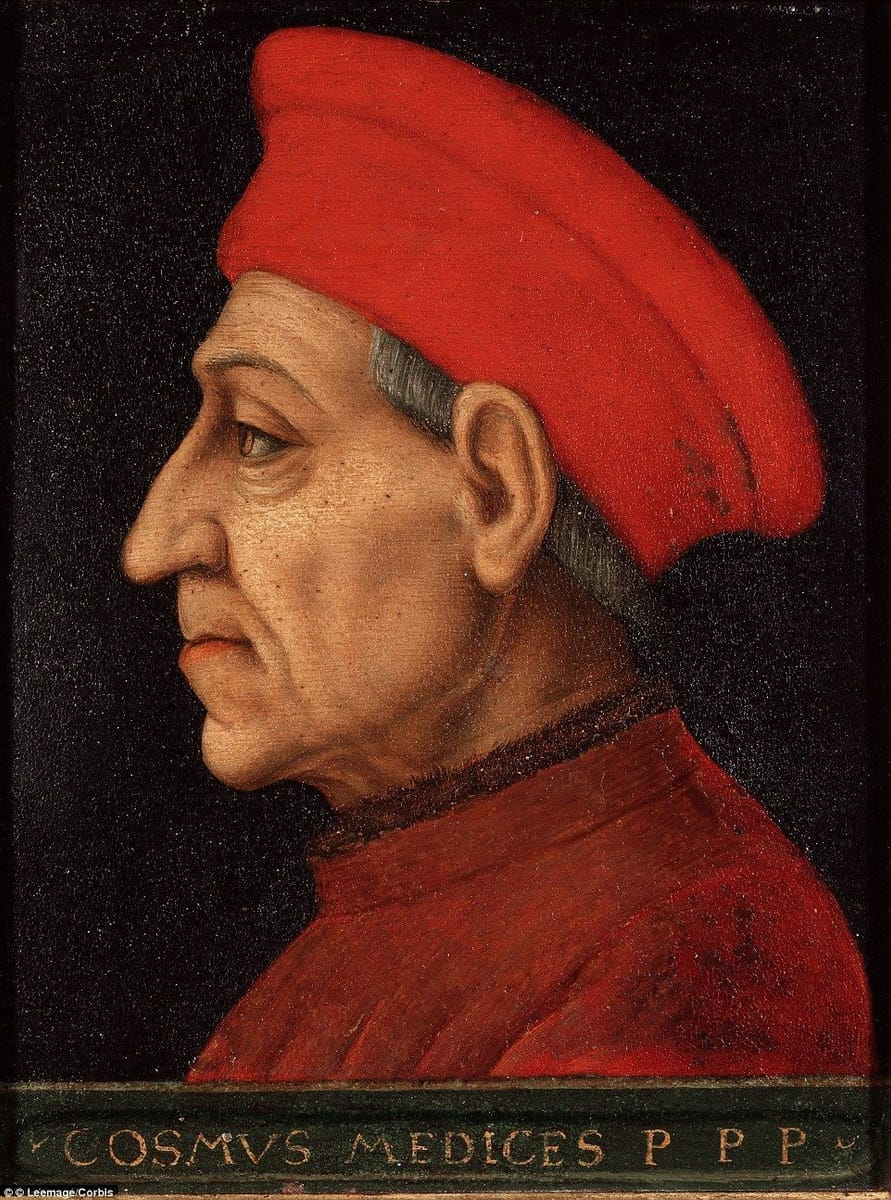
Cosimo de' Medici the Elder

In 1349 the convent was almost completely abandoned on account of the Black Death plague and only came to flourish again in 1420 when Cosimo de' Medici (the Elder) bought it, rebuilt it, enlarged the refectory, built the bell tower (campanile), the cloister, the sacristy, the cistern and the loggia, the latter following a project of Michelozzo, who altered the church of St Bonaventure, situated within the convent, giving it a portico fitted with columns on the outer rather than the inner side, embellishing it with a single nave with vaulting in the form of rib vaulting and enlarged the polygonal choir. In front of the latter there is a sixteenth-century reredos in wood displaying the Medici arms in gold intarsia.

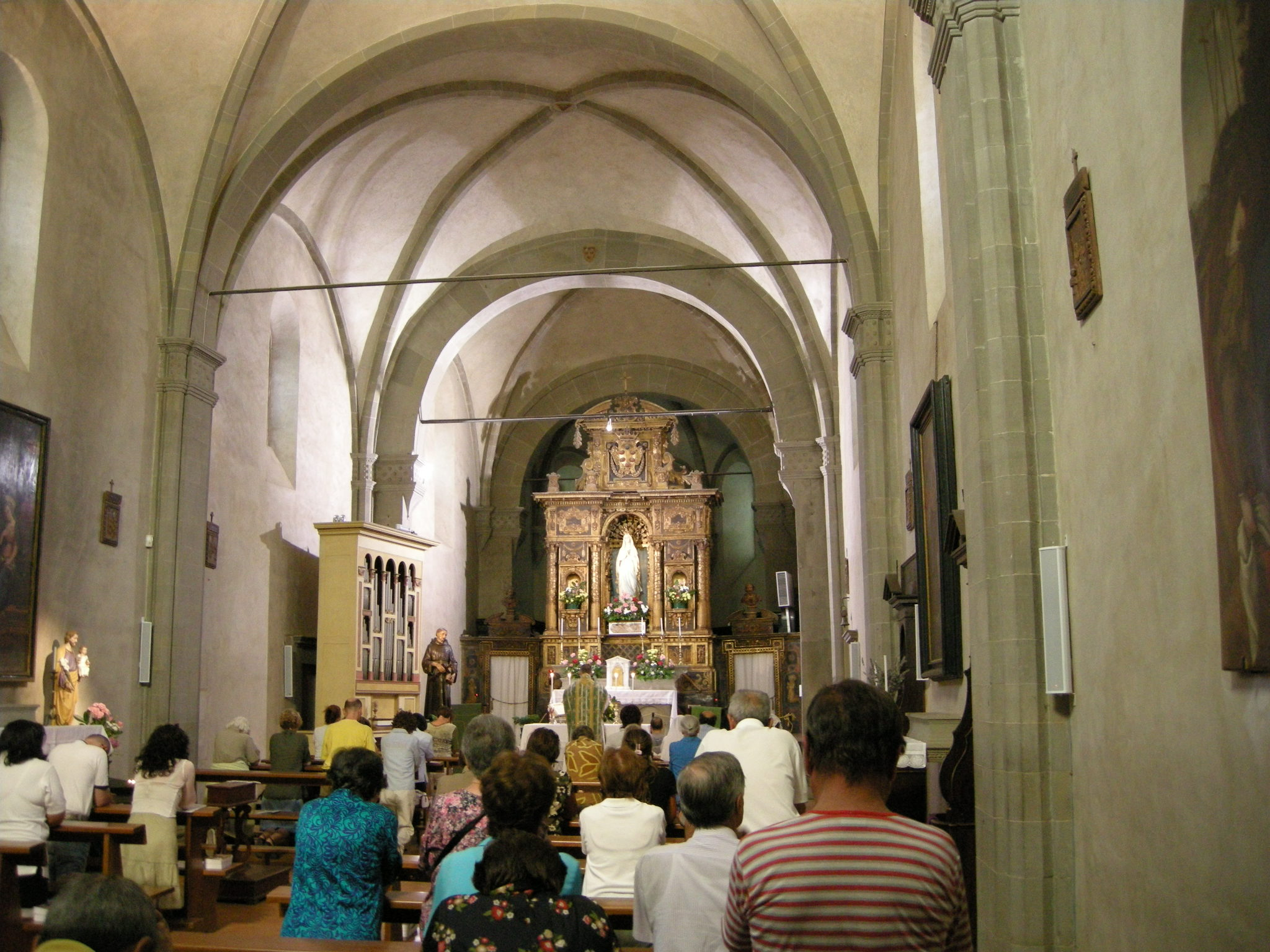
Interior of the church

In 1427, by bull of Pope Martin V, it came to be inhabited by religious; and about 1430 Cosimo I set up a library with many valuable books. The Bosco ai Frati altarpiece executed by Fra Angelico in tempera on wood (174x174 cm) and dating to 1450–1452, is nowadays conserved in the Museo nazionale di San Marco in Florence.

In 1542 an earthquake occasioned serious damage to convent, especially the bell tower. The convent once more fell on hard times and was suppressed by Napoleon. After the latter's fall, the friars were able to return and stayed until 1866, when the government of the newly united Kingdom of Italy suppressed the convent. However, the new owner, the Marquis Gerini, rebuilt the church and then handed the convent back to the Franciscans.

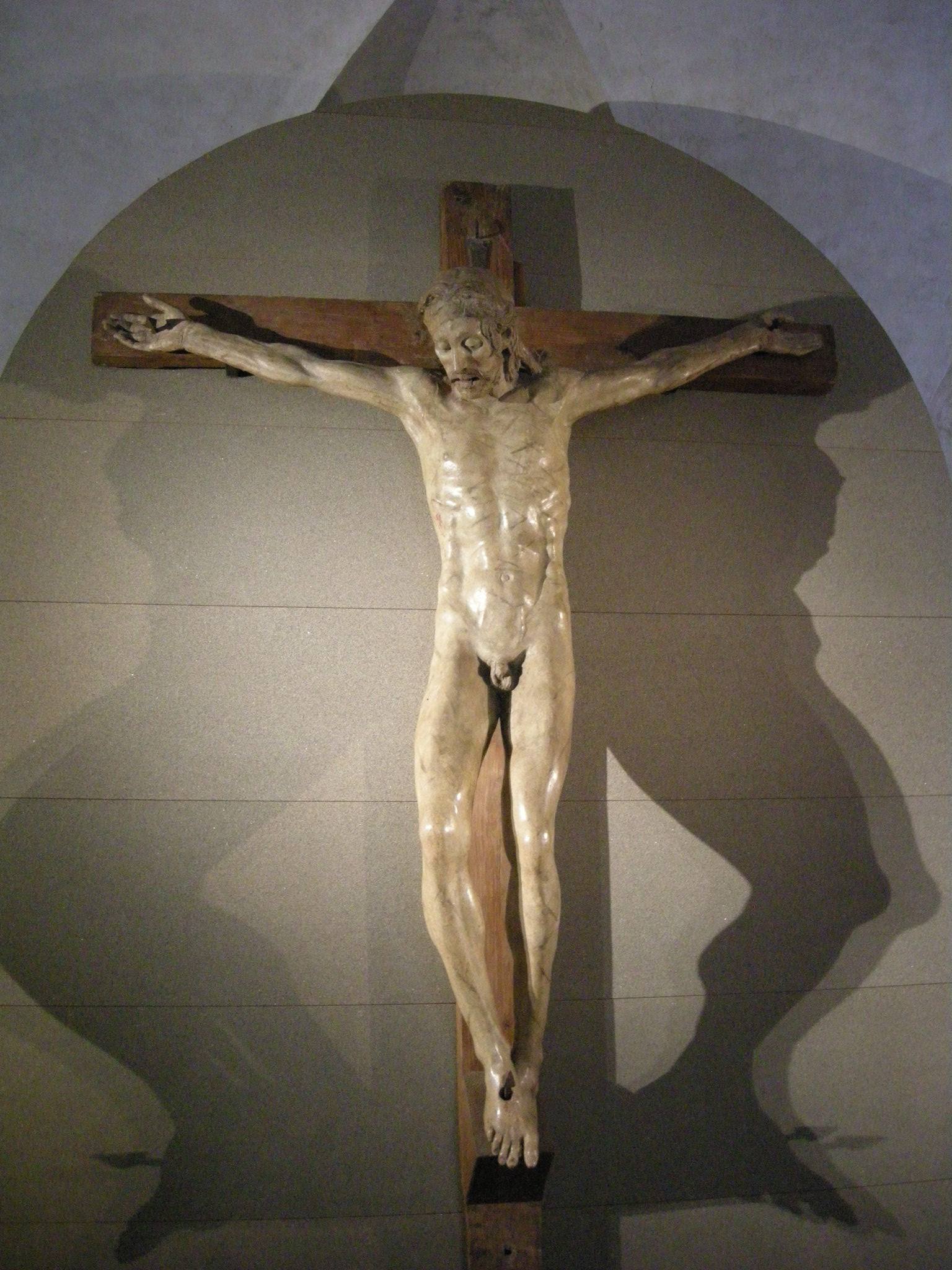
Crucifix, school of Donatello

The church contains a painting by Jacopo Ligozzi, signed and dated 1579, depicting The Establishment of the Franciscan Third Order and a highly decorated sixteenth-century altar. The sacristy has a fresco in the manner of the Florentine School from the first half of the fifteenth century.

The cloister contains a Museo di Arte sacra (Museum of Sacred Art) which conserves a wooden crucifix discovered in 1950 and attributed to Donatello or his workshop (c. 1460). The museum also has sacred vestments and liturgical objects from the convent, some bearing the arms of the Gerini. The cloister gives access to Michelozzo's refectory and to the kitchen garden, adjoining the friars’ cells.

Giuliano Ughi della Cavallina, an Observant Franciscan of the sixteenth century, was the author of a work entitled Relazione dell'origine e del progresso del Convento del Bosco (Account of the Origins and Development of the Convent of Bosco). He died in the convent and was buried there.

== Work of art formerly at Bosco ai Frati ==
- Fra Angelico, Bosco ai Frati Altarpiece, now in the Museo nazionale di San Marco

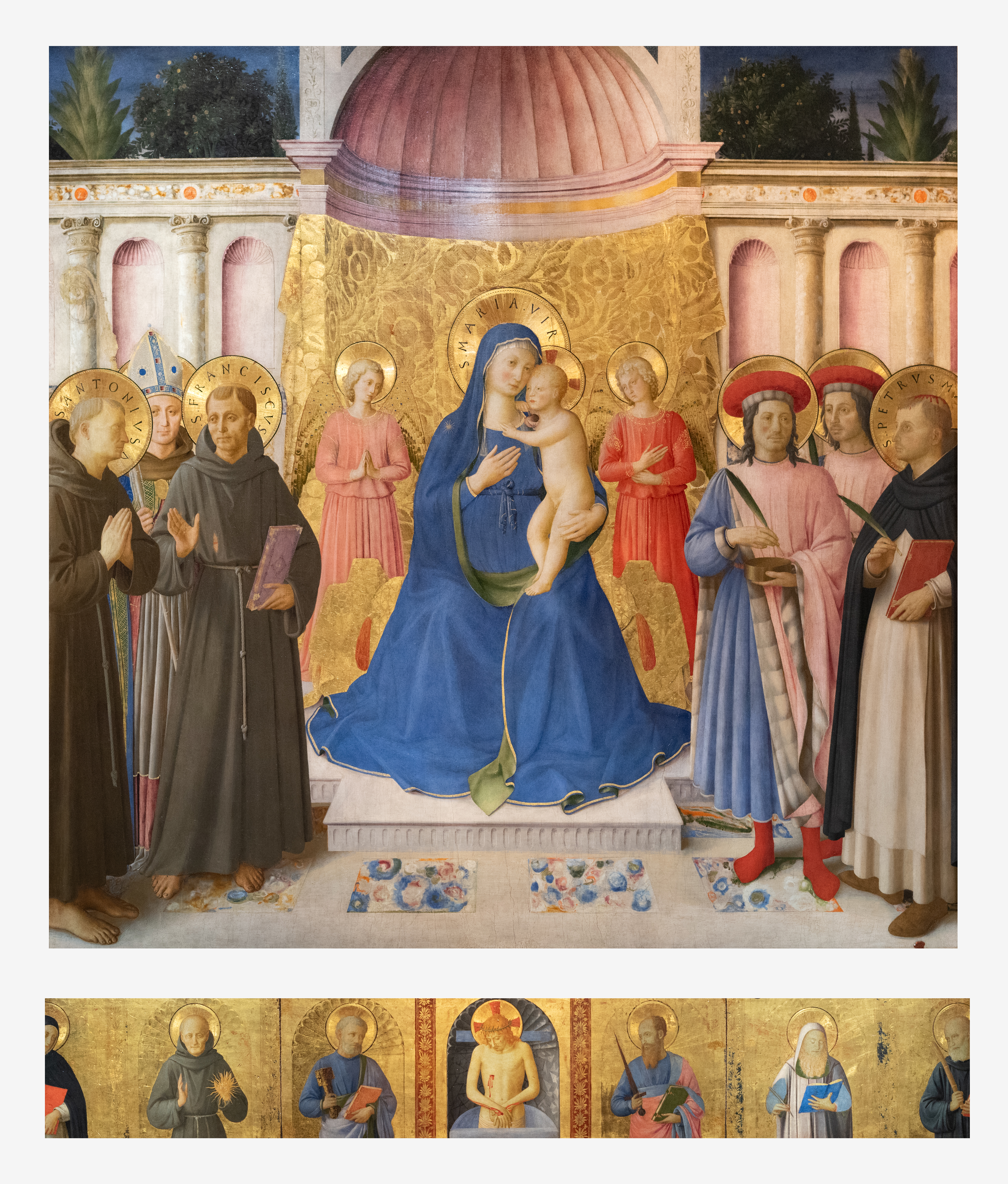
Fra Angelico, Bosco ai Frati Altarpiece

== Bibliography ==
- Gaspero Righini, Mugello e Val di Sieve, note e memorie storico-artistico-letterarie, Firenze, 1956
- Guida d'Italia, Firenze e provincia, Touring Club Italiano, Milano, 2007
- Trinita Kennedy, Sanctity Pictured: The Art of the Dominican and Franciscan Orders in Renaissance Italy, Nashville, 2014
