= Lake Bilancino =

Lake in Tuscany, Italy

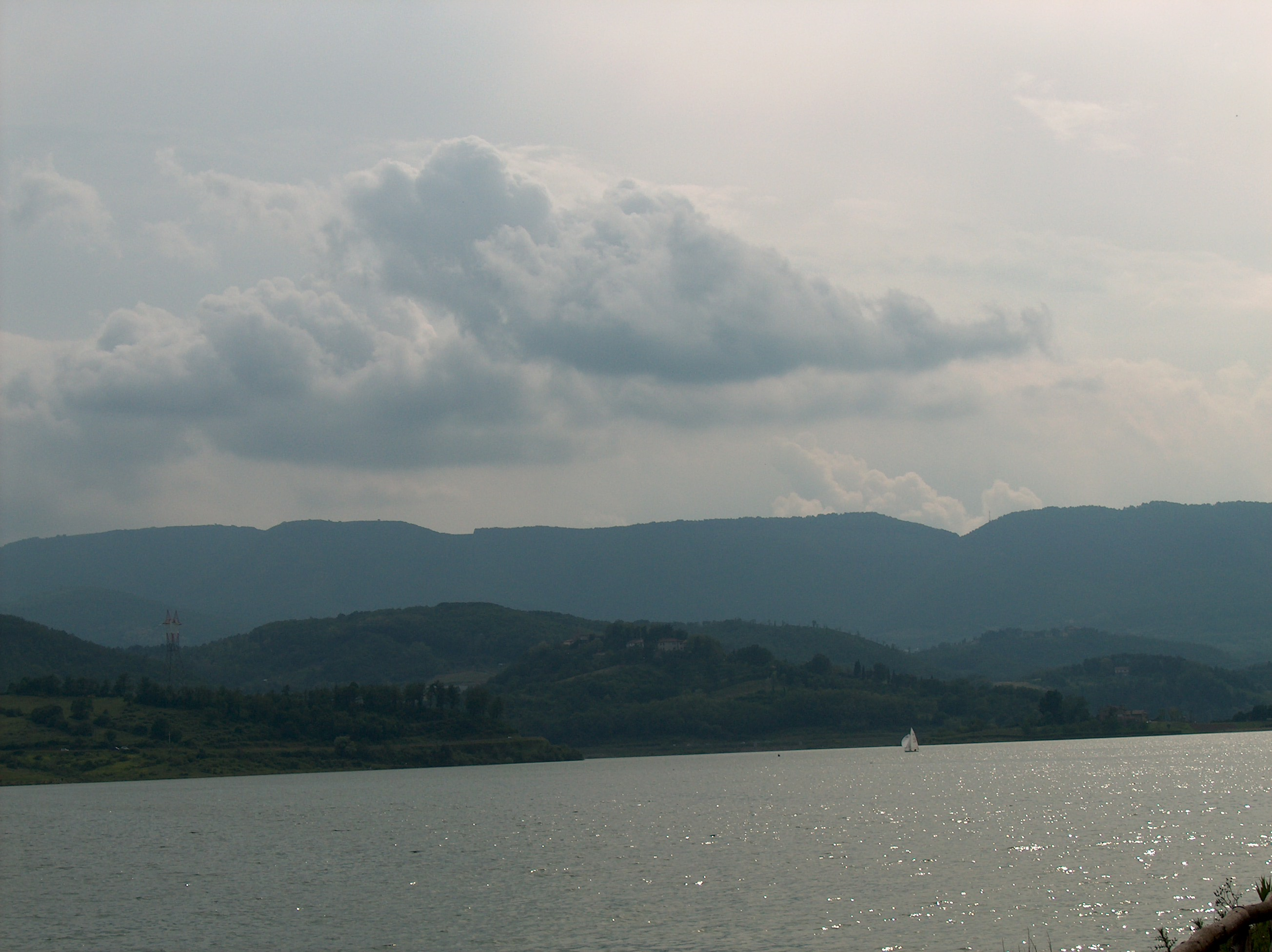

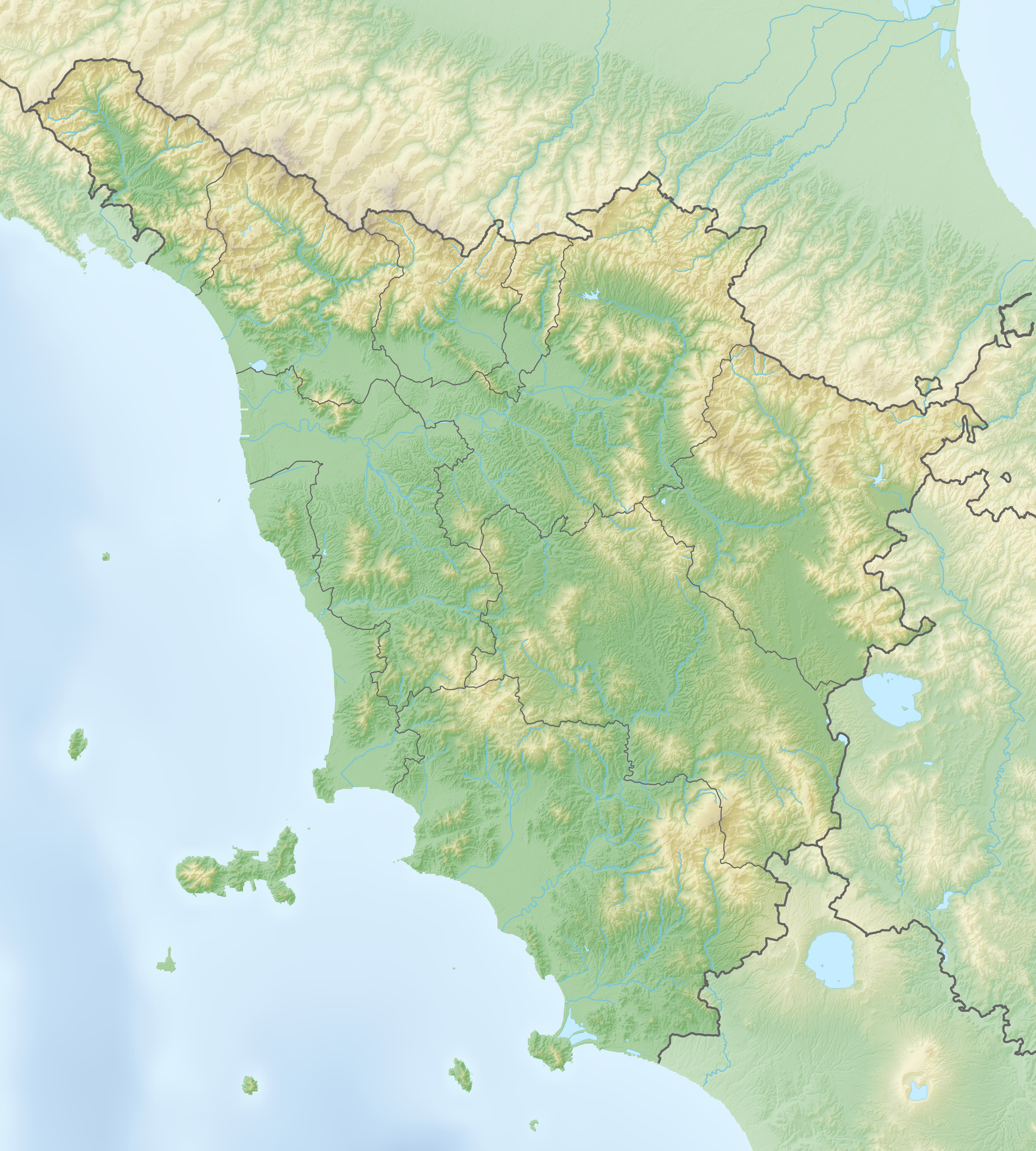
- Location within Tuscany
- Location: Mugello valley, Metropolitan City of Florence, Tuscany
- Coordinates: 43°58′37.82″N 11°15′48.11″E
- Primary inflows: Sieve
- Primary outflows: Sieve
- Basin countries: Italy
- Surface area: 5 km^{2} (1.9 sq mi)
- Surface elevation: 252 m (827 ft)

Lake Bilancino is an artificial lake near Barberino di Mugello in the Metropolitan City of Florence, Tuscany, Italy, made with a dam on the river Sieve. At an elevation of 252 m, the lake surface area is approximately 5 km^{2}. The lake is found within the watershed of River Arno.
