= Calenzano =

- Comune
- Comune di Calenzano
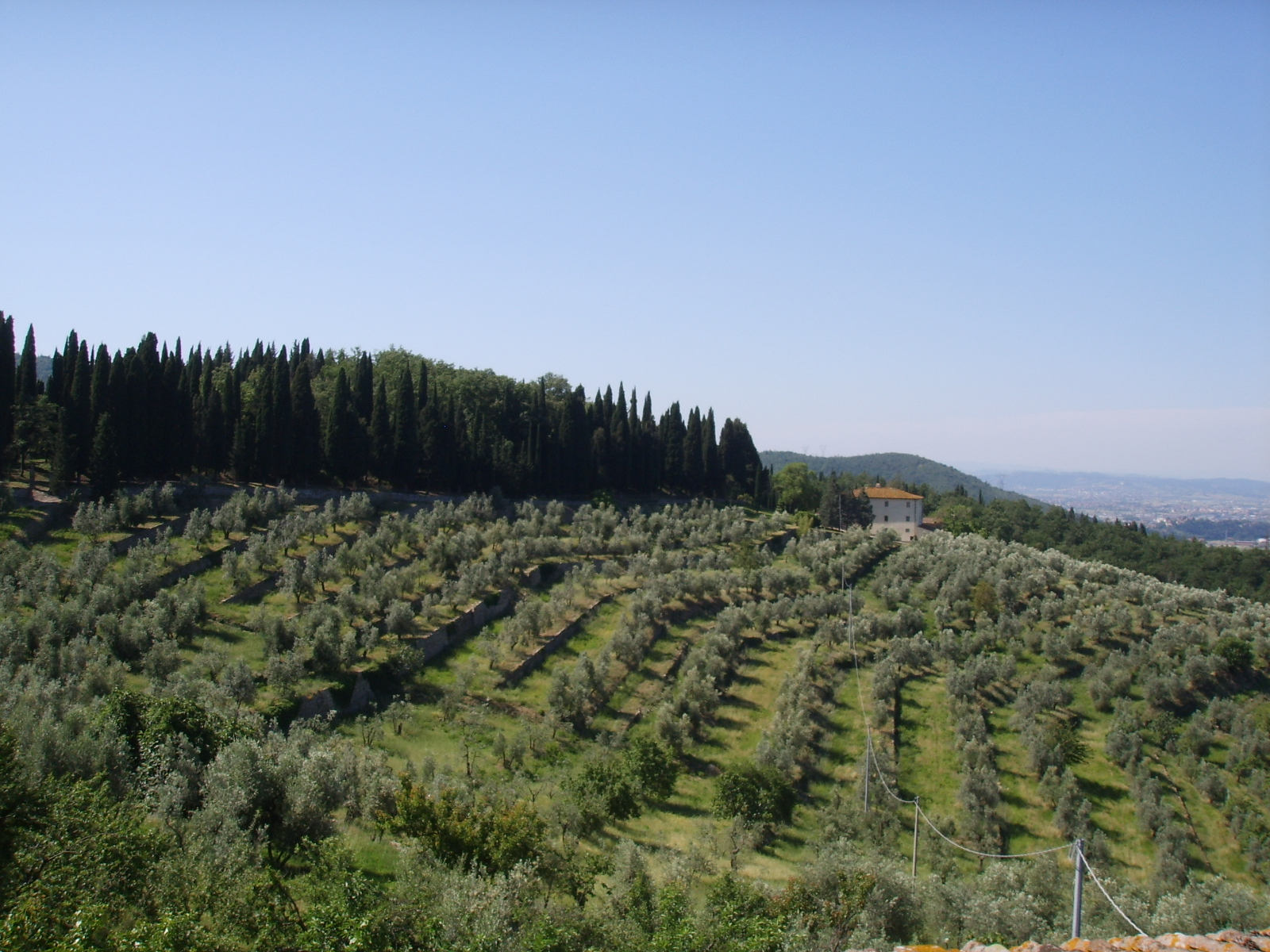
- Hills in the territory of Calenzano

- Location within Italy Location within Tuscany
- Coordinates: 43°52′N 11°10′E
- Country: Italy
- Region: Tuscany
- Metropolitan city: Florence (FI)
- Frazioni: Baroncoli, Carraia, Collina, Croci di Calenzano, Leccio, Legri, Osteria degli Alberi, Querciola, San Donato, San Pietro in Casaglia, Secciano, Settimello, Sommaia, Spazzavento, Travalle

Government
  - Mayor: Riccardo Prestini

Area
  - Total: 76.9 km^{2} (29.7 sq mi)
- Elevation: 108 m (354 ft)

Population (Dec. 2004)
  - Total: 15,557
  - Density: 202/km^{2} (524/sq mi)
- Demonym: Calenzanesi
- Time zone: UTC+1 (CET)
  - Summer (DST): UTC+2 (CEST)
- Postal code: 50041
- Dialing code: 055
- Patron saint: St. Nicholas
- Website: Official website

Calenzano (Italian pronunciation: [kalenˈdzaːno]) is a comune (municipality) in the Metropolitan City of Florence in the Italian region Tuscany, located about 11 kilometres (7 mi) northwest of Florence. As of 31 December 2004, it had a population of 15,557 and an area of 76.9 square kilometres (29.7 mi^{2}).

Calenzano borders the following municipalities: Barberino di Mugello, Campi Bisenzio, Prato, San Piero a Sieve, Sesto Fiorentino, Vaglia, Vaiano.

== Main sights ==
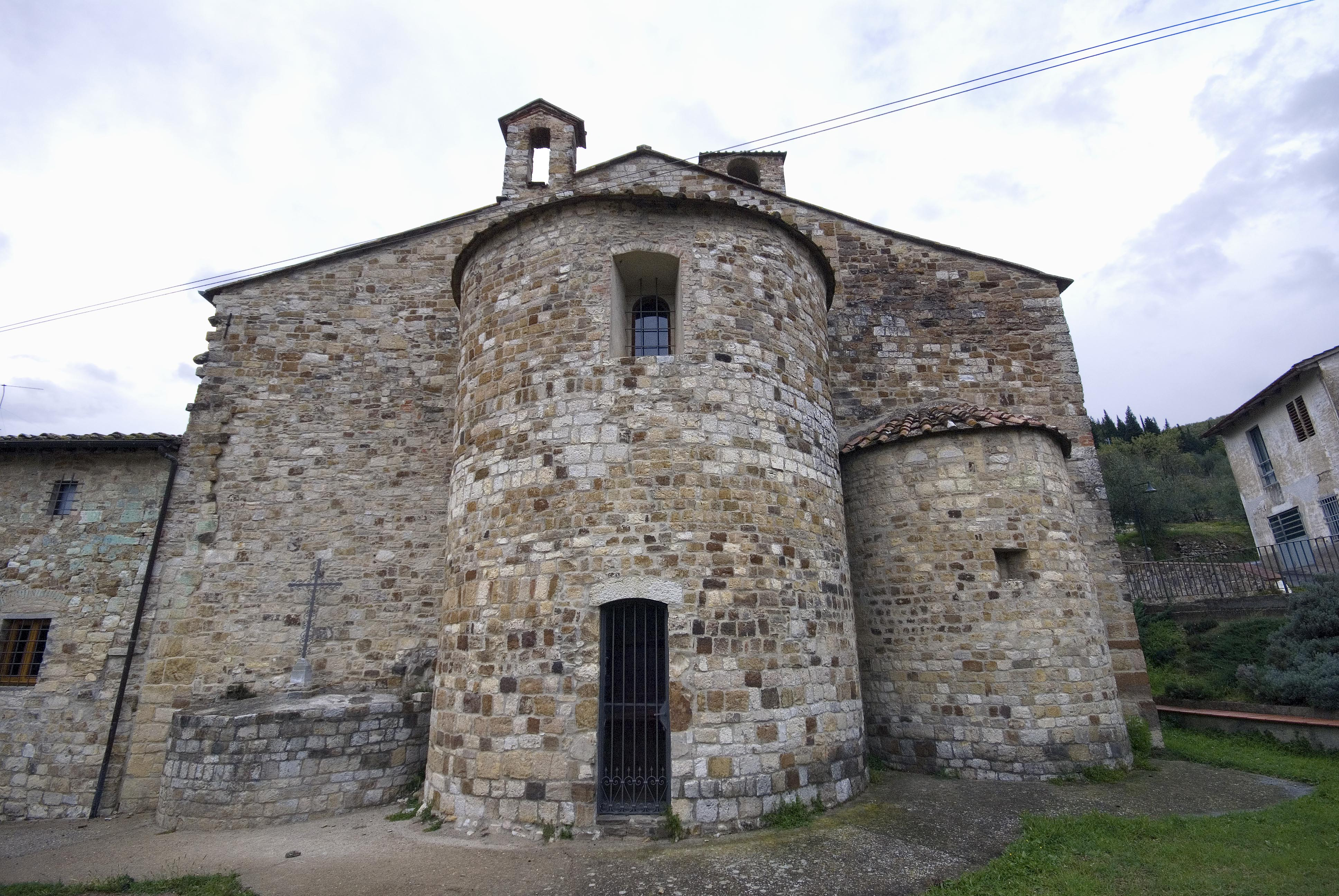
Pieve di San Severo, outside Calenzano

- Villa Ginori a Collina, a patrician villa
- Church of San Niccolò e Oratorio della Compagnia del Santissimo Sacramento, rebuilt before 1386. It includes frescoes by Jacopo and Nardo di Cione and a panel by Domenico Cresti.
- Pieve di San Donato (9th-11th centuries), with a Renaissance cloister built in 1460 by Carlo de' Medici.
- Pieve di Santa Maria (built before the 11th century). It houses a Madonna with St. Thomas from Lorenzo di Credi's workshop and a St. Anthony the Abbot from Ridolfo del Ghirlandaio's school.
- The ancient Pieve di San Severo, with frescoes from the 14th-15th centuries.
- Church of Santa Lucia a Settimello (before 10th century, rebuilt in Baroque style in the early 18th century). It houses a terracotta by Benedetto Buglioni (1507) and a wooden crucifix by Baccio da Montelupo (early 16th century)
- Parco del Neto (park), at the foot of Monte Morello.

== Transportation ==
Calenzano has a station on the regional railway connecting it to Prato, Florence, Pistoia and Lucca. It can be reached by road from the A1 Motorway. Bus services connect it to Prato, Florence, Campi Bisenzio and Barberino di Mugello.

== Demographic evolution ==
Historical population

Year	Pop.	±%
1861	5,762	—
1871	6,483	+12.5%
1881	6,763	+4.3%
1901	7,219	+6.7%
1911	7,794	+8.0%

Year	Pop.	±%
1921	7,874	+1.0%
1931	7,951	+1.0%
1936	8,099	+1.9%
1951	8,232	+1.6%
1961	8,745	+6.2%

Year	Pop.	±%
1971	11,098	+26.9%
1981	13,466	+21.3%
1991	14,959	+11.1%
2001	15,042	+0.6%

Source: Data from ISTAT
