= Giuliano Ughi della Cavallina =

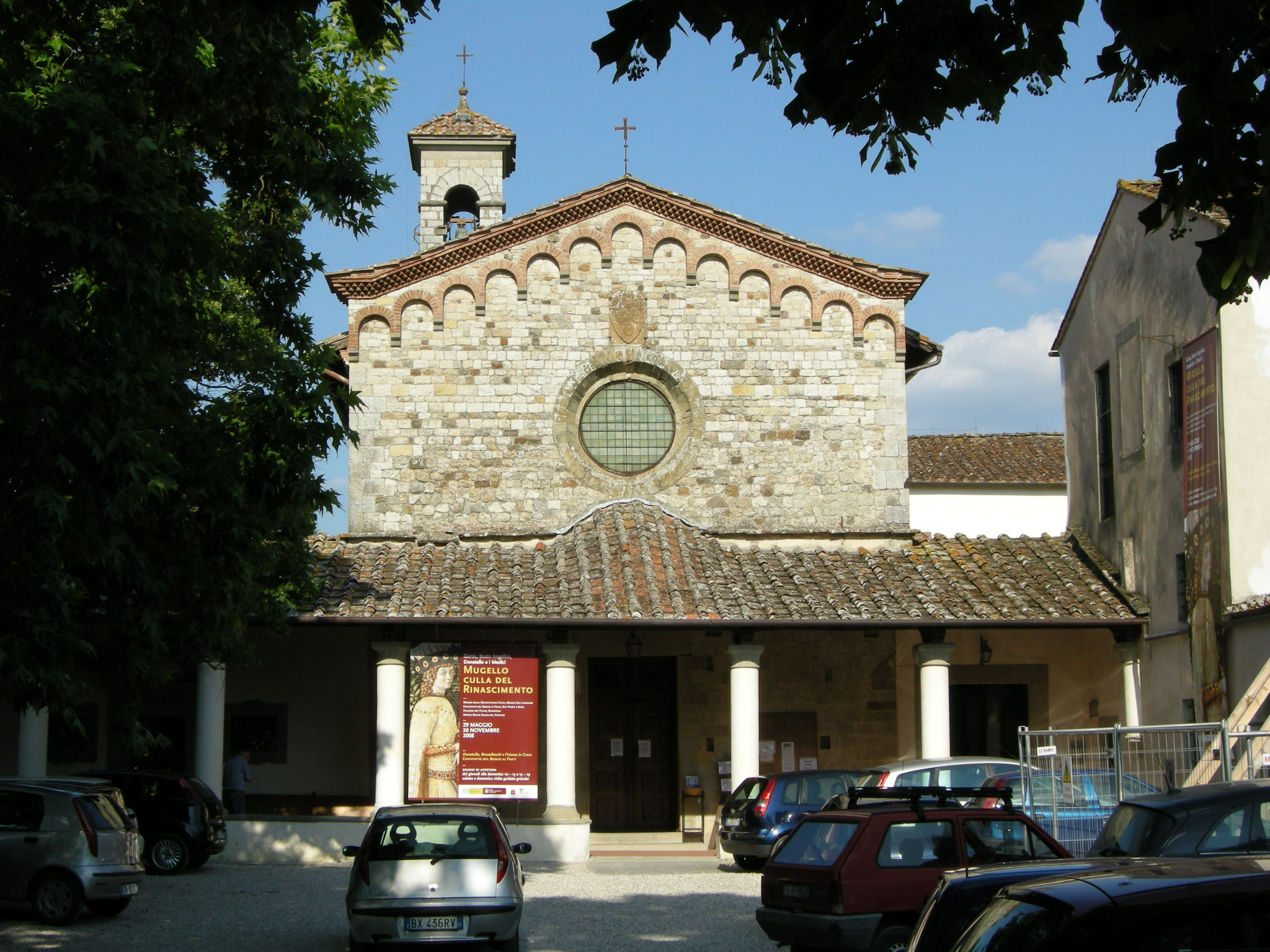
Convento of Bosco ai Frati

Giuliano Ughi della Cavallina, or Giuliano della Cavallina, (Cavallina di Mugello, 1483 – Bosco ai Frati, 1569) was a sixteenth-century Franciscan friar and writer. He spent his youth in his native village, La Cavallina, today a hamlet of some 2,500 inhabitants in the comune (municipality) of Barberino di Mugello, in the Province of Florence in the Italian region Tuscany, located about 25 km north of Florence. The hamlet today has a square named after its famous son: Piazza fra Giuliano Ughi, 50031 Cavallina, Italy

Giuliano may have received the religious habit already in [1501], but in any case he became an Observant Franciscan at Prato in 1514. He later entered the community of the Convent of Bosco ai Frati, where he remained till his death and where he is buried.

The convent and its extensive surrounding woods had been donated to Saint Francis di Assisi and had become a Franciscan friary in 1212. Having been abandoned on account of the Black Death, it was revived, rebuilt and embellished and restored to the Franciscans from 1420 by Cosimo de' Medici (the Elder).

Giuliano was a writer whose main work is the Cronica di Firenze (Chronicle of Florence) which covers the years 1501 to 1546. Among other events, it furnishes details on the successful siege of Florence by imperial troops which returned the exiled Medici to power, and is written in the local dialect of the Mugello region.

He wrote at least three other works: the Vita della Beata Chiara Ubaldini, (Life of the Blessed Chiara Ubaldini), the biography of a local abbess, Relazione dell'origine e del progresso del Convento del Bosco (Account of the Origins and Development of the Convent of Bosco) and Relazione sui danni al Convento del Bosco ai Frati causati dal terremoto del 13 giugno 1542 (Account of the Damage to the Convent of Bosco ai Frati caused by the earthquake of 13 June 1542). The latter two are increasingly employed as a source by historians and seismologists. One manuscript of the Chronicle is conserved as Florence, Biblioteca Biomedica dell’Università degli Studi di Firenze, Mss. R. 210.4.

== Bibliography ==
- Gaspero Righini Mugello e Val di Sieve, note e memorie storico-artistico-letterarie, Firenze, 1956
- Giuseppina Carla Romby, Un borgo rurale del Mugello, la Cavallina: Uomini, lavoro, insediamenti fra '400 e '500, Biblioteca comunale, Barberino di Mugello, 1984.
- Giuliano Ughi della Cavallina, Cronica di Firenze o compendio storico delle cose di Firenze dall'anno MDI al MDXLVI, ed. Francesco Frediani, Archivio storico italiano, Appendice 7 (1849)
- Giuliano Ughi della Cavallina, Relazione sui danni al Convento del Bosco ai Frati causati dal terremoto del del 13 giugno 1542, ed. Francesco Frediani, ibidem.
- Giuliano Ughi della Cavallina, Relazione del Convento del Bosco di Mugello, ed. Giuseppina Carla Romby, Giorgi & Gambi, Firenze, 1984.
