= Diotto =

Historical reenactment that is held each year in Scarperia, Italy

Palio del Diotto
- Status: active
- Genre: historical competition known as "Palio"
- Date: 8 September
- Frequency: annual
- Locations: Piazza dei Vicari, Scarperia
- Country: Italy
- Participants: "Rioni" (wards) of Scarperia
- Organiser: Proloco di Scarperia
- Website: Palio del Diotto

The Diotto (Italian pronunciation: [ˈdjɔtto]) is the celebration for the anniversary of the founding of Scarperia, held each year on 8 September. The name itself recalls the date: dì as for "day" and otto which means "eight". Actually, the founding occurred on 7 September 1306, but it was decided that the anniversary date should have been the day after, birth of the Virgin Mary.

The celebration is a historical reenactment made up of a pageant from Florence and Scarperia, and a competition called Palio, which designate both the event and the prize.

== History ==
Scarperia was founded by decision of the Florentine Republic in 1306 to administrate and defend a vast territory north of Florence, on the slopes of Apennine Mountains. In the beginning a Captain was appointed mainly with military purpose, then during the Renaissance in 1415 the figure changed in a Vicar who was able to manage and rule the growing town in every aspect. At the take office a celebration was held in the little village, primarily with tournaments, tug of war and arm wrestling, to show the new vicar the strength and stamina of the inhabitants. In the post-war era the commemoration mutated in a historical reenactment: first a costumed entertainment show, and since 1969 a "palio" disputed between the wards of the town.

== Wards, team composition and games ==
The former comune of Scarperia, since January 1, 2014 frazione in the Scarperia e San Piero municipality, is subdivided into thirteen rioni (wards). Every team is made up of six players plus a non-player captain at least 16 years old; they represent a rione and wear a different colour:

- Red of Castel San Barnaba
- White of Santa Croce e Fagna
- Blue of Senni, Birilli e Crocioni
- Yellow of Rosine
- Black of Ponzalla
- Purple of San Gavino e Topo
- Green of Sant'Agata
- Pink of San Clemente
- Sky blue of Marcoiano
- Grey of Cerliano
- Orange of Poggio Savelli
- Burgundy of La Torre e Petrona
- White and green of Montaccianico

Since only four teams take part to the final, the qualifiers (some days before) are needed to define the three rioni that will join the defending champion at the Diotto.

=== The "vigor" games ===
The palio is divided into five different games (giochi di gagliardia), which are always played following the same order:

- knife throwing
- bricks race
- tug of war
- bigonce race
- pole climbing

Winning a game let the team score four points, the second gets three, the third two, the fourth one. If a team is disqualified during a game, it scores one point. If a team or a player doesn't want to finish the game or the violation is serious, the team scores no points.

If it's necessary due to a tie at the end of the fifth game, the tie-breaker is the knife throwing to determine who is the winner.

==== Knife throwing ====
A player from each team has to throw one by one six knives towards a wooden target from a distance of four meters at least, trying to gather as much points as he can. If the knife is stuck into the red and smallest circle the team gets five points, for the yellow medium circle it gets three points, for the green and largest circle one point, if the tip isn't driven into the wood, or the knife falls down, or rather it's stuck outside the green circle, the team doesn't score any points.

==== Bricks race ====
It's a relay race in which every player must run on bricks for the entire distance of the field of play (piazza: square), so that the follower can do the same, until the fourth relay runner has finished. The racers use three bricks for the run plus two backup ones, which can replace the damaged or broken bricks. A runner cannot put the foot on the ground, or three times the heel down, until he has completed the quarter: if the player does so, he must restart.

==== Tug of war ====
All the six components of the team pull a rope of hemp fiber to beat the opponents, until a tape passes a line marked on the ground. Since the sloping square favors one of the two teams, the regulation provides for two rounds. If the rounds end with a tie, there's a deciding match where the sides of the square are set by flipping a coin. The ranking is drawn up after two semifinals and two finals.

==== Bigonce race ====
It's a fast and spectacular relay race for all the six components of the team, four of which are the runners and two the torri (towers). The game is about getting into the bigoncia, running a whole piazza and jumping out of it, while the two torri, remaining out of the field of play, help the racers to get in and out as quickly as they can. The bigoncia is a wooden slats wine barrel - made bottomless - with the shape of truncated cone and has very tight size, so that rushing in it is difficult. Running backwards is forbidden for safety reasons.

==== Pole climbing ====
The challenge is divided in two heats: the semifinals and the finals, in single race each, drawing the pole by flipping a coin. A specialist player for every team has to climb a wooden pole about eight meters tall, grab a little flag (representing the Cockaigne), descend and run to the camp-master waiting in the middle of the square to give him the pennant before the opponent. The pole is not greased or soaped, but the width and height of it make this game the most dangerous and arduous. A climbing technique which is considered too perilous or "monkey-like" (stretched arms, and chest far from the pole) will lead to disqualification.

==== Tie-breaker ====
In case two or more teams are in a draw after the fifth game, a knife throwing will determine the winner. If there is a new tie after that, series of three knives will be thrown until one team prevails.

== The pageant ==
The symbol of Florence and Scarperia painted on the banners: a red fleur de lis

Since Scarperia was built by decision of the Republic of Florence in the 14th century and was the main "Terra nova" (new land) north of the city, when a Vicar was appointed the many nobles and families representing the Florentine aristocracy traveled to reach the village. Nowadays, retracing the celebrations held back then, the pageant (Corteo storico) from Florence follows the incoming Vicar, escorted by armed soldiers as halberdiers, culverin conveyors and armigers, at the sound of drums and clarions, accompanied by the gonfaloniere and flag throwers. After sunset the outgoing Vicar meets the incoming one with his own pageant from Scarperia and together they reach Piazza dei Vicari, where the herald describes the possessions that the new dignitary will rule. After the Vicar has sworn an oath of loyalty to Florence in a solemn ceremony, the palio begins.

== Bibliography ==
- Various Authors. Il Palio del Diotto [The Palio of Diotto] (in Italian). Edizioni Firenze. ISBN 88-7970-285-8.
