= Villa Medici at Cafaggiolo =

Historic estate in Tuscany, Italy

Coordinates: 43°57′53.42″N 11°17′41.87″E

Construction of the new Castello Mediceo di Cafaggiolo began in 1452.

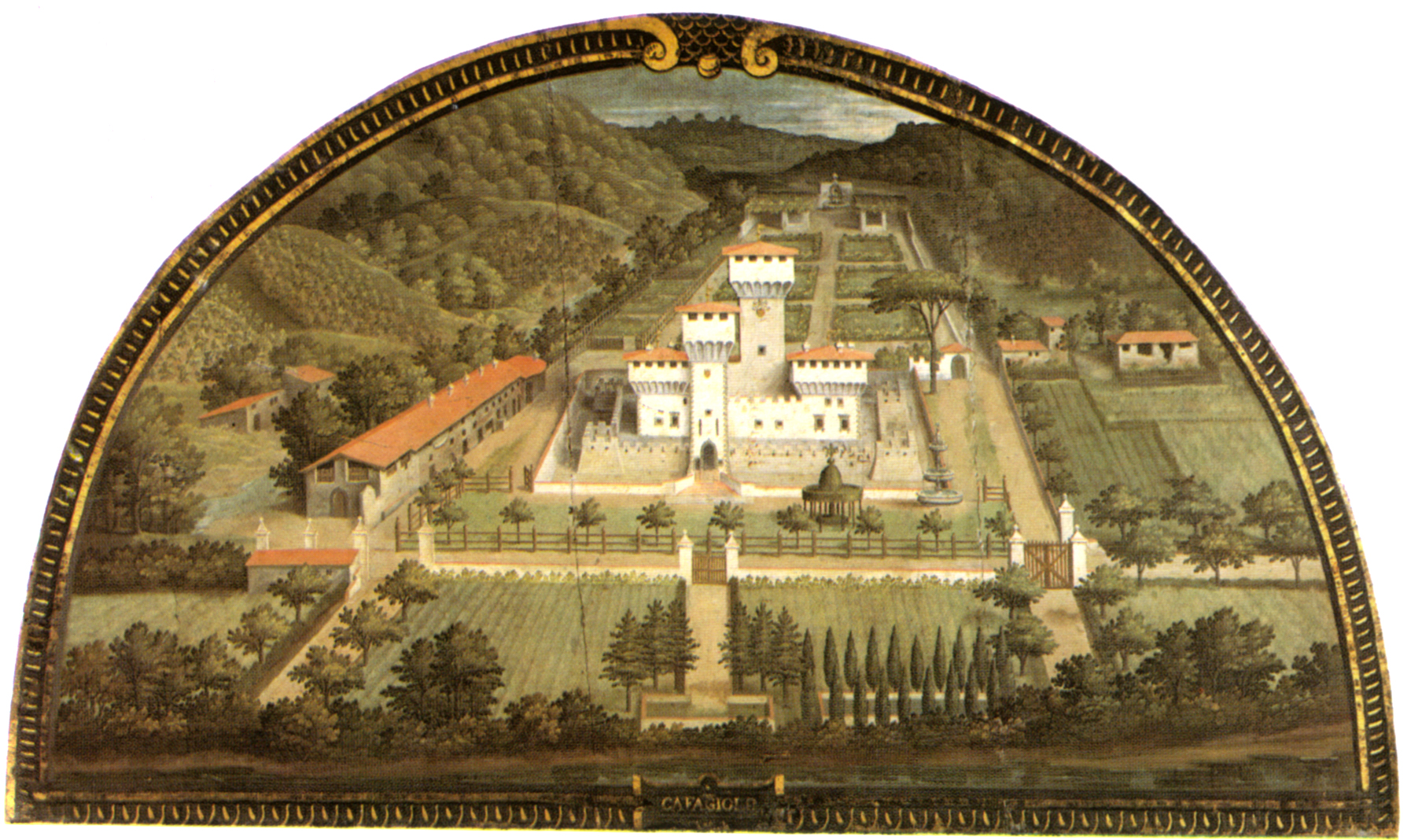
Castello Mediceo di Cafaggiolo, in a view by Giusto (or Gustav) Utens, 1599.

The Villa Medicea di Cafaggiolo is a villa situated near the Tuscan town of Barberino di Mugello in the valley of the River Sieve, some 25 kilometres north of Florence, central Italy. It was one of the oldest and most favoured of the Medici family estates, having been in the possession of the family since the 14th century, when it was owned by Averardo de' Medici. Averardo's son, Giovanni di Bicci de' Medici, is considered to be the founder of the Medici dynasty.

The villa was reconstructed following designs of the eminent Renaissance architect Michelozzo in 1452, becoming a meeting place for some of the greatest intellectuals of the Italian Renaissance. The villa is located in the Mugello region, the area which was the homeland of the Medici. Although by no means the grandest or largest of their many houses, they visited it often: as a consequence, the villa was the scene of many momentous events in the history of the dynasty, ranging from the reception of Medici brides to the murder of a Medici wife.

The castle is today privately owned by the company Società Cafaggiolo srl.

== History ==
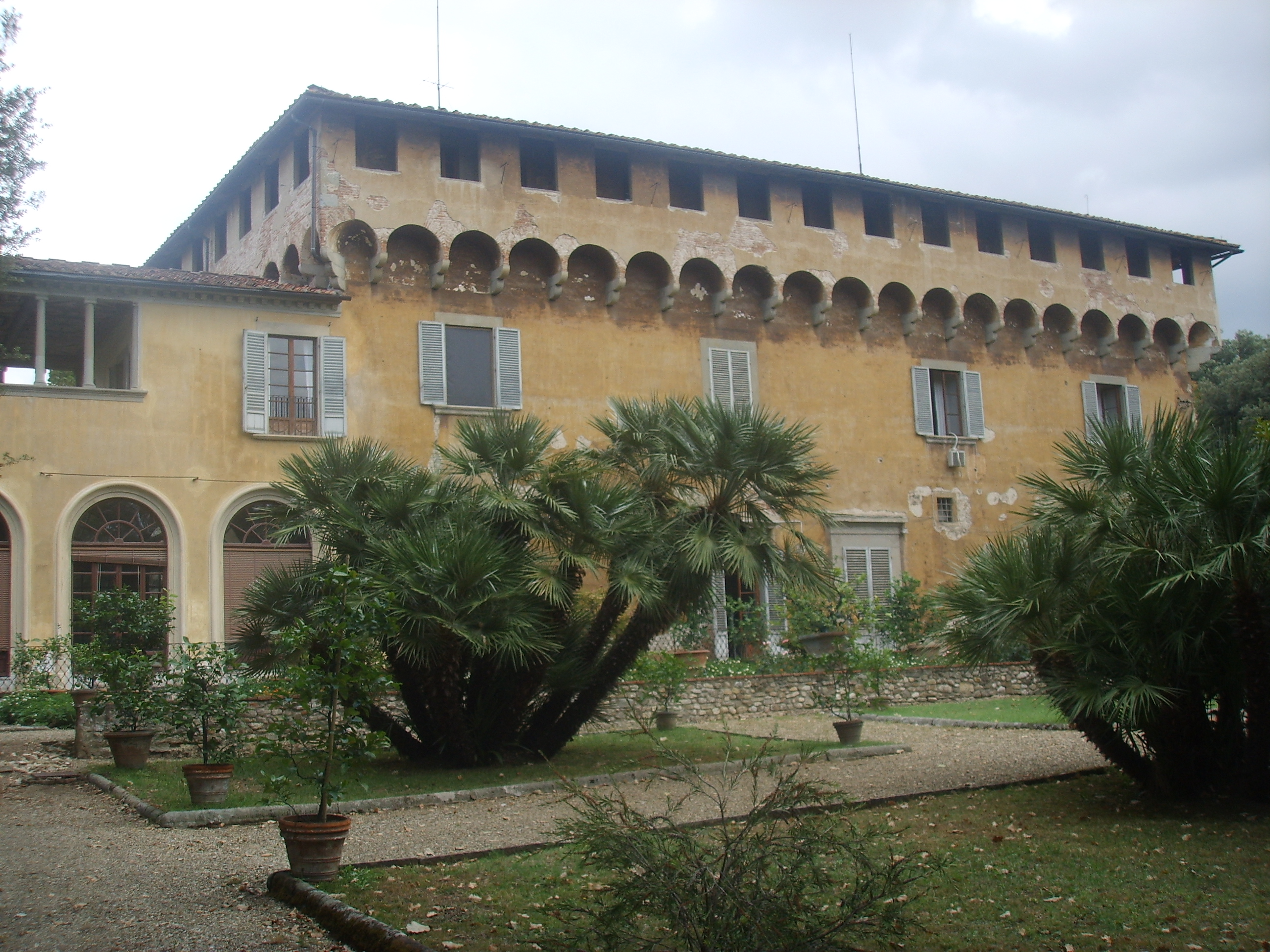
Villa Medicea di Careggi, the first of the Florentine villas, was also created for Cosimo de' Medici by Michelozzo from an existing castle.

During the 15th and 16th centuries, the Tuscan aristocracy, who had forsaken their medieval castles for the political expediency, comfort and greater security of town life, developed an aesthetic awareness which necessitated the seasonal occupation of a country retreat. The new humanist values they sought could be found in an attractive country setting, enhanced by a garden. The first of these villas were built by the Medici family, whose affluence coincided with the beginning of the Renaissance period, circa 1420. The builder of Villa Medicea di Cafaggiolo was Cosimo de' Medici, whose villa at Careggi is considered to be the model for the Renaissance villas of Florence. These early villas as in the case at both Careggi and Villa Medicea di Cafaggiolo were the result of the complete rebuilding of existing Medici castles.

The Villa Medicea di Cafaggiolo's origins date from the 14th century. The fortezza that belonged to the Republic of Florence in 1349 was already known as "Cafaggiolo de' Medici" by 1359, when it was the property of Averardo de' Medici (died 1363). It passed from Giovanni di Bicci jointly to Averardo and Giuliano di Francesco de' Medici, the grandsons of Averardo's younger son Lorenzo; from them, it passed to Cosimo and Lorenzo jointly; and it was ceded to Cosimo's sole ownership in a property division of 1451.

In the following year, 1452, Averardo de' Medici's grandson Cosimo de' Medici (known as Cosimo the Elder – the first of the Medici to combine leadership of the family bank with governing the Republic of Florence) commissioned his favourite architect Michelozzo to redesign his fortress as a more comfortable country retreat, which could be used for hunting. It was to be one of four villas built by Cosimo, the others being Careggi, Villa Mozzi and Villa Trebbia. Michelozzo had already designed the Medici's town palazzo in Florence, the Palazzo Medici-Riccardi, and Cosimo's new villa at Careggi. The architect transformed the forbidding fortress into a castellated country house – in effect, the castle became a villa.

After the death of Cosimo de' Medici in 1464, the villa became a hunting lodge of his son Piero. Piero was succeeded in 1469 by his son Lorenzo de' Medici (known as "il Magnifico"), and it became his favourite residence. Frequently occupied both winter and summer, it became a meeting place for the great intellectuals of the day, who came either for the many parties dedicated to hunting, or merely to entertain the court with their learning – for example, Luigi Pulci is known to have read aloud his Morgante there. Lorenzo composed many of his songs at Cafaggiolo, and entertained such worthies as Marsilio Ficino and his most faithful friends, Poliziano and Pico della Mirandola.

From 1476 onwards, Lorenzo il Magnifico needed to raise funds, the Pope having seized many of his assets. He borrowed from his cousins, with the eventual result that ownership of the villa was transferred after protracted negotiations to Lorenzo di Pierfrancesco and his brother Giovanni in 1485. Cafaggiolo thus passed for a time to the younger branch of the Medici — who established the manufacture of maiolica in the villa's outbuildings — until all the Medici holdings were once more reassembled in the hands of Cosimo I de' Medici, Grand Duke of Tuscany.

The Medici Pope Leo X, formerly Giovanni di Lorenzo de' Medici, spent a part of his childhood at the castle, and briefly held court at the villa on 15 December 1515, on his return from his secret talks with Francis I at Bologna, in which it was said that he had played a double game in his efforts to drive the French out of Italy.

In 1576, the castle was the scene of the murder of a Medici wife. Neglected by her husband, Eleonora di Garzia di Toledo, the wife of Pietro de' Medici, had been conducting an illicit love affair with Bernardino Antinori, a young nobleman. Their affair came to light when Antinori killed a fellow noble, Francesco Ginori, in self-defence. Antinori confessed to his crime and was banished to Elba by Eleonora's brother-in-law, Francesco I de' Medici, Grand Duke of Tuscany. From Elba, Antinori recklessly sent love letters to Eleonora. These letters fell into the hands of the Grand Duke, who promptly had Antinori executed to preserve the family's honour. On 11 July 1576, Pietro, the cuckolded husband, summoned his wife to the castle, where he strangled her with a dog leash. Reports of the murder were suppressed and it was reported she had died of a heart attack. Eleonora was buried with the full pomp and honours usually accorded a member of the Medici family in the Medici Chapel (the family mausoleum) at the Basilica di San Lorenzo. Her homicidal husband was sent from the Florentine court to the court of Spain until his own death in 1604.

In 1737, on the death of Gian Gastone de' Medici, the last Medici ruler of Tuscany, Cafaggiolo came into the possession of the Medici's successors, the House of Habsburg-Lorraine, in the person of Francis I, Holy Roman Emperor. As the consort of the future Empress Maria Theresa of Austria, he seldom visited Tuscany, remaining in Vienna.

That the villa at Cafaggiolo was a favoured home of the Medici is without doubt, if only because it survived as a Medici residence for far longer than many of their other homes: the great Palazzo Vecchio, their seat of power, was subsequently vacated in 1587 for the Palazzo Pitti. Cosimo de' Medici's other villa by Michelozzo, Villa Trebbia, was sold in 1644 by Ferdinand II to Giuliano Serragli for 113,500 scudos.

In 1864, the castle was sold by the Italian Government to Prince Marcantonio Borghese. Borghese carried out a vast rebuilding program, altering much of Michelozzo's design. The new designs swept away remaining fortifications such as the moat and enceinte walls, while the interior was redecorated in a more ancient, medievalizing style.

== Architecture ==
Unlike many of the Tuscan residences created by the Medici family, Villa Medicea di Cafaggiolo does not adhere to ideals of Renaissance architecture. This cannot be attributed to its date of 1452, the year Michelozzo was charged with transforming the building from castle to villa. The first true Renaissance building, the Ospedale degli Innocenti in Florence, had been designed as early as 1419, and Michelozzo had proved his understanding of the new form in 1444 with his design for the ten-sided extension to Santissima Annunziata, Florence, inspired by a plan from the Roman temple of Minerva Medica. and between 1444 and 1460 he constructed the first of the 15th century Renaissance palazzos, the Medici-Riccardi for Cosimo de' Medici. This palazzo provides another possible reason for the conservative design of the castle – Cosimo had been heavily criticised in Florence by the Florentine nobility for what was considered the pretentious design of the more Renaissance Palazzo Medici-Riccardi.

The architectural style was a deliberate retrospective quattrocento – a style and period which combined both the Gothic and classical styles, and a period of transformation which was the birth of the Renaissance, perhaps best exemplified by Brunelleschi's dome of Florence Cathedral, begun in 1417. The dome, in itself, a classical feature, is Gothic in its use of the pointed arch, but rises to a classical oculus. or put simply "Gothic in form but Renaissance in detail". In style, the castle resembled the Palazzo Vecchio, the Medici's older Florentine residence, to which Michelozzo was also making alterations while the castle was being built.

Thus, at first glance, the architecture of Castello Mediceo di Cafaggiolo appears that of a medieval castle rather than a villa, with a crenellated tower at the front flanked by two battlemented wings, reinforced with bastions at each corner. These Gothic and Renaissance features were not included by Michelozzo to retain older features from the earlier fortress but, 33 years after the commencement of Brunelleschi's Ospedale degli Innocenti, as a deliberate motif intended to fulfil the humanist need that a villa should be "a place for the spirit to rest" which was compatible with the buildings intended use a country retreat and hunting lodge. Its machicolations and crenelations, in reality no more than a projecting crenelated pediment, supported by small arches and corbels, were only intended for decoration, not defence. That is not to say that the villas was completely undefended, and this is apparent in the architecture. The political climate of the period required all noble houses to be semi-fortified; so, just as in the design of the first great urban palazzi, the ground floor was "a defended courtyard surrounded by guardrooms and quarters for men at arms". This structure dictated the fenestration: the windows are few, small and high from the ground on the lower floor, while those on the upper floors, occupied by the household proper, were larger and more plentiful. Utens' 1599 painting shows nothing in the way of outer defences and fortifications: a moat is known to have existed, probably one of the few feature retained from the older fortress.

The view (above) painted by Giusto/Gustav Utens in 1599 shows the villa as completed by Michelozzo. Built around a courtyard, the front appears much as it does today, but with a larger tower dominating the building at the rear. It is possible that this tower (now demolished) was retained from the older fortress. A similar tower exists at another Medici villa, Villa La Petraia, which Bernardo Buontalenti retained in 1575 when converting that villa from an earlier fortress, for Francesco de' Medici.

== Gardens ==
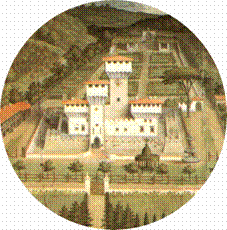
Detail of Utens' view of 1599, showing layout of the gardens. It depicts green grass, fountains and planting all symbols of the greatest luxury in the parched Tuscan landscape.

Just as Renaissance architecture looked back to the classical civilizations, so did Renaissance garden design. The gardens of Renaissance were terraced with ilex groves and walks bordered with myrtle and statuary, just like those of the ancient Romans. To the humanist Renaissance noble, the gardens were of equal importance as the villa. The hallmarks of Renaissance architecture were symmetry, balance and precise proportions, and if the Villa Medicea di Cafaggiolo itself did not quite meet these demands, its gardens certainly did. Renaissance principles were strictly applied to the garden's design: during this era a garden came to be viewed as an extension of the house itself and as such was arranged in the same order. Statuary and seating were placed much as it was within the house – lining compartmentalised sections, the sections representing rooms and halls. Grottoes provided not only protection from the sun but a setting for allegorical scenes depicted in statuary and water. At Cafaggiolo, the greatest sculptors of the day were employed on the creation of the fountains, grottoes and statuary, including Tribolo, Vasari and Buontalenti, who created sculptured tableaux depicting scenes in stone conceived by Benedetto Varchi.

Utens' view of the villa in 1599 also shows another popular garden feature of the era – water. Often a scarce commodity, when water was available, it was piped to fountains and cascades – providing not only the obvious irrigation, but also movement and sound. The presence of water also permitted the greatest luxury in a Tuscan garden, green grass. This symbol of luxury was usually planted only near the house where it could be constantly admired. Topiary and hedging, which demanded less moisture, was used in preference to colourful planting, providing the seclusion necessary to divide the garden into compartmentalised sections, and also shade and living green statuary. Thus, the Renaissance garden became as much as symbol of the owner's wealth and culture as his house or art collection.

== Cafaggiolo maiolica ==
The long outbuilding to the left of the castle in the image above was known as the Manica Lunga, the "long wing"; this building was used for the manufacture of the tin-glazed earthenware known as maiolica. The 1498 inventory notes that the fornaze col portico da cuocere vaselle ("kilns for baking pottery") in the piazza murata (walled enclosure) were let to Piero and Stefano foraxari, the "kilnmasters" of the maiolica manufactory for which Cafaggiolo is famed. These are Piero and Stefano di Filippo da Montelupo, who started up the kilns under Medici patronage in 1495.

== See also ==
- Medici villas
- Maiolica of Cafaggiolo

== Sources ==
- Cesati, Franco (1999). I Medici (in Italian). Firenze: La Mandragora. ISBN 88-85957-366. (also published in English as OCLC 51769082)
- Langdon, Gabrielle. Medici Women: Portraits of Power, Love, and Betrayal. Toronto: University of Toronto Press, 2007. ISBN 978-0-8020-9526-8.
- John Shearman, "The Collections of the Younger Branch of the Medici" The Burlington Magazine 117 No. 862 (January 1975), pp. 12, 14-27. Inventories of Cafaggiolo and other Medici villas, at the deaths of the brothers Lorenzo (1503) and Giovanni di Pierfrancesco (1498).
- Foster, Philip E. A Study of Lorenzo de' Medici's Villa at Poggio a Caiano (New York and London) 1978
- Coats, Peter (1968). Great Gardens of the Western World. New York: Hamlyn Publishing.
- G. Pieraccini, La stirpe de' Medici di Cafaggiolo (Florence) 1924.
