= Mugello =

Area in Tuscany, Italy

Coordinates: 43.95°N 11.3833°E

Mugello within Metropolitan Florence

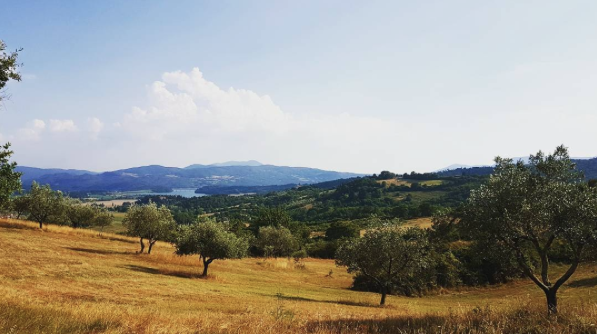
Countryside near Galliano di Mugello

The Mugello (Italian pronunciation: [muˈdʒɛllo]) is a historic region and valley in northern Tuscany, Italy, corresponding to the course of the River Sieve. It is located to the north of the city of Florence and includes the northernmost portion of the Metropolitan City of Florence. The Futa Pass connects the Mugello valley to the separate Santerno river valley.

== Name ==
The name is first recorded in the 6th century AD, in connection with the retreat of the Ostrogothic king Totila into the valley during the Gothic War. The continuation of the Chronicon of Marcellinus Comes, completed in 548, and the Romana of Jordanes, written in 551, both give the Latin form ad Mucellos. In 11th- and 12th-century documents the original form continues as Mucello. (Note: actum Mucello in 916 AD, in loco Mucelli in 1031, and in Mucello in 1086. Some 9th- and 10th-century documents instead show Mudilo, a hyper-Latinising spelling in which the ending was reshaped on the Latin diminutive suffix -ellus rather than a genuine phonetic stage.) Only in the 12th century did the -c- shift to -g-, a change common in northern Italy, where consonants between vowels tended to soften. This gave the forms Mugiello and Mugello.

The name is of pre-Latin origin, though its etymology is disputed. Carlo Tagliavini derived it from the Latin personal name Mucellus, a diminutive of the probably Etruscan Mucius. Carlo Alberto Mastrelli instead saw a base muc- ('projection, height') combined with the suffix -ello-, which he regarded as characteristically Ligurian. (Note: Mastrelli, rejecting the connexion to Mucellus, observes that simple place names formed from personal names without a predial suffix are uncommon, and that Tuscan toponyms derived from Mucius normally show a geminate -cc-.)

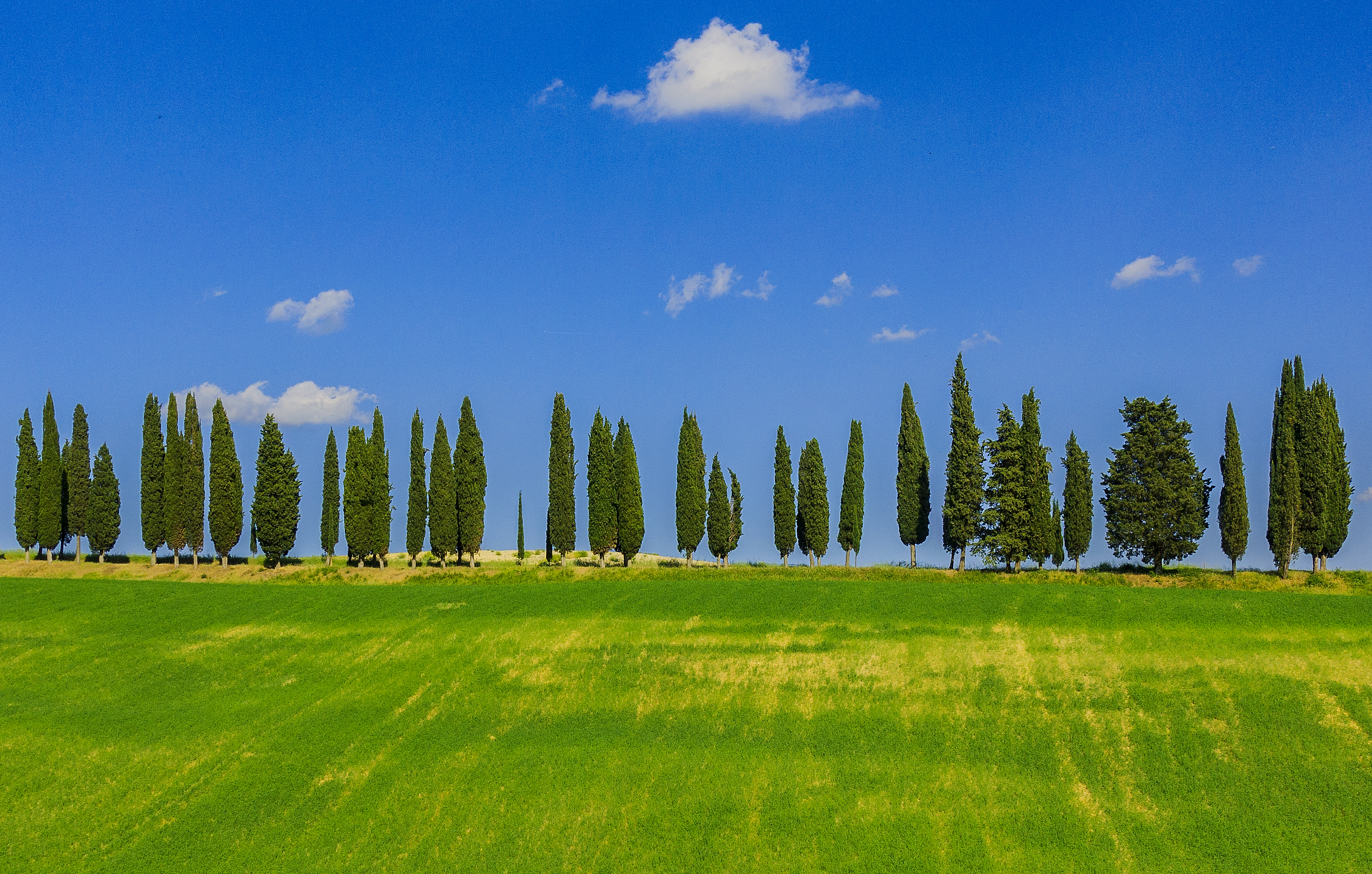
A Mugello road lined with cypress trees

An older view connected the name with the Magelli, a Ligurian people listed by Pliny the Elder among the peoples citra Alpes. This identification, though widely repeated, is rejected by modern scholarship, since the Magelli belonged to the regio Liguria and not to the regio Etruria in which the Mugello lies, and the oldest forms of the place name (6th-century ad Mucellos) show a voiceless -c- and an -u- vocalism incompatible with the ethnic name.

== History ==
=== Prehistory ===
Stone tools attest human presence in the valley from the Palaeolithic, including Mousterian artefacts near Galliano (Scarperia) and Neolithic axes from Firenzuola and Marradi. At Poggio Colla, near Vicchio, occupation has been traced from the Holocene through the Neolithic and the Middle Bronze Age, predating the Etruscan settlement.

=== Antiquity ===
Poggio Colla became the region's principal Etruscan site, a hilltop sanctuary and settlement occupied from the seventh century BC until it was destroyed, together with the surrounding settlement, around 187 BC. A sandstone stele found there in 2015, the Vicchio Stele, is one of the longest and earliest Etruscan sacred texts.

During the Gothic War, the Ostrogothic king Totila withdrew into the Mugello in 542 after lifting his siege of Florence, an episode that gives the earliest record of the district's name.

=== Middle Ages ===
In the Middle Ages the Mugello was dominated by rural lordships, foremost the Ubaldini, whose power radiated from the Sieve valley. Their origins were traditionally traced to the Lombard period, and the family is documented from the end of the 11th century, in the person of Ubaldino di Azzo, probably its eponym. They held their lands as vassals of the margraves of Tuscany, the bishop of Florence and the Guidi counts, sharing the Mugello with the latter, who held its eastern part, and they controlled the Apennine passes between Tuscany and Bologna, so that the territory astride the watershed came to be called the alpes Ubaldinorum.

The lordship brought the Ubaldini into lasting conflict with Florence, whose commerce depended on free passage across the passes they held. Florence prevailed only by military conquest in the course of the 14th century, which turned the alpes Ubaldinorum into the alpes florentine. Their principal stronghold, Monteaccianico, on which the cardinal Ottaviano degli Ubaldini had raised a fortress, fell to Florence in 1305 after a siege of the Ghibelline exiles sheltering there.

To consolidate its hold and secure the road to Bologna, Florence resettled the rural population in new towns (terre nuove): Scarperia, founded in 1306, and Firenzuola, laid out in 1332 and peopled from former Ubaldini villages. The two anchored a new road across the Apennines and became the principal Florentine centres of the region, Scarperia holding the vicar of the Mugello.

=== Modern period ===
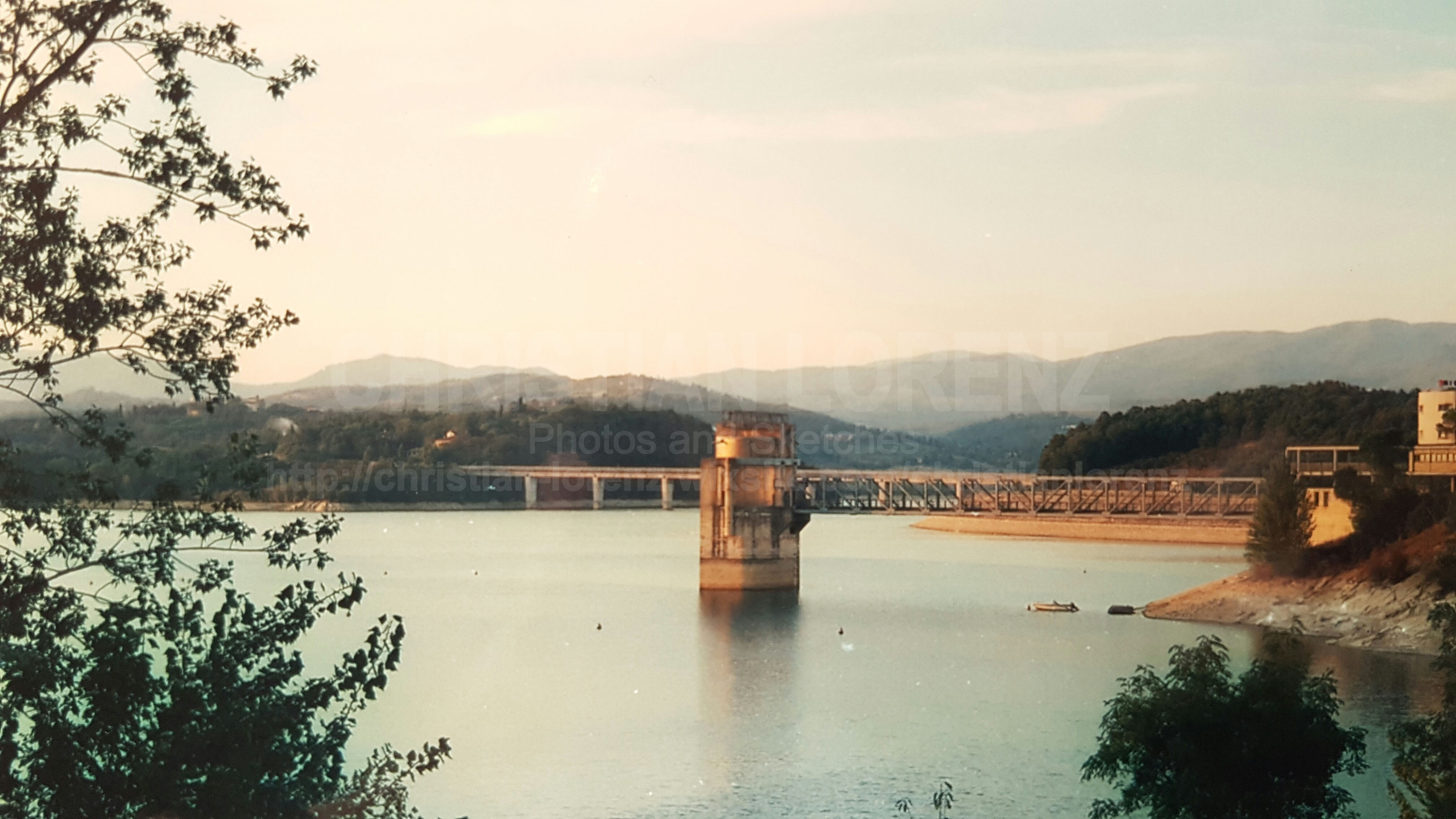
Dam across the Sieve at Lake Bilancino

In 1999 a dam was constructed across the Sieve river, forming the reservoir of Lake Bilancino in the Mugello valley.

== In popular culture ==
The Mugello gives its name to the Mugello Circuit (Autodromo Internazionale del Mugello), an automobile race track that hosts an annual Moto GP event, and to the Mugellese chicken, a bantam breed. There is also the Bano Mugello calf.

== Towns ==
- Borgo San Lorenzo
- Scarperia
- Barberino di Mugello
- San Piero a Sieve
- Vicchio
- Dicomano
- San Godenzo
- Palazzuolo sul Senio

== See also ==
- Firenzuola
