= Barberino di Mugello =

- Comune
- Comune di Barberino di Mugello
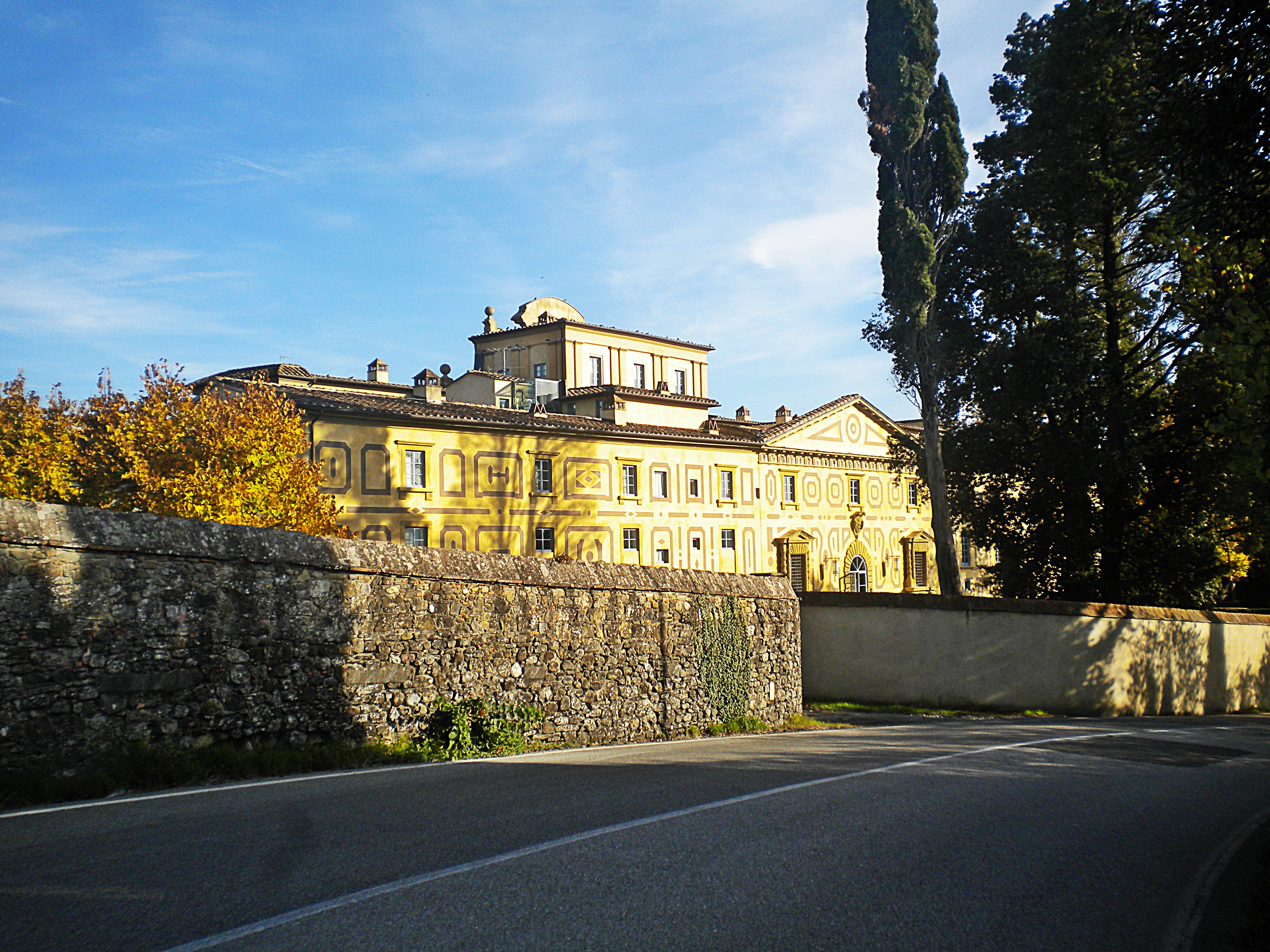
- Villa Le Maschere

- Coat of arms

- Location within Italy Location within Tuscany
- Coordinates: 44°00′05″N 11°14′21″E
- Country: Italy
- Region: Tuscany
- Metropolitan city: Florence (FI)
- Frazioni: Cavallina (2500 abitanti circa), Galliano, Montecarelli, Latera

Government
  - Mayor: Giampiero Mongatti

Area
  - Total: 133.29 km^{2} (51.46 sq mi)
- Elevation: 270 m (890 ft)

Population (28 February 2017)
  - Total: 10,864
  - Density: 81.506/km^{2} (211.10/sq mi)
- Demonym: Barberinesi
- Time zone: UTC+1 (CET)
  - Summer (DST): UTC+2 (CEST)
- Postal code: 50031
- Dialing code: 055
- Website: Official website

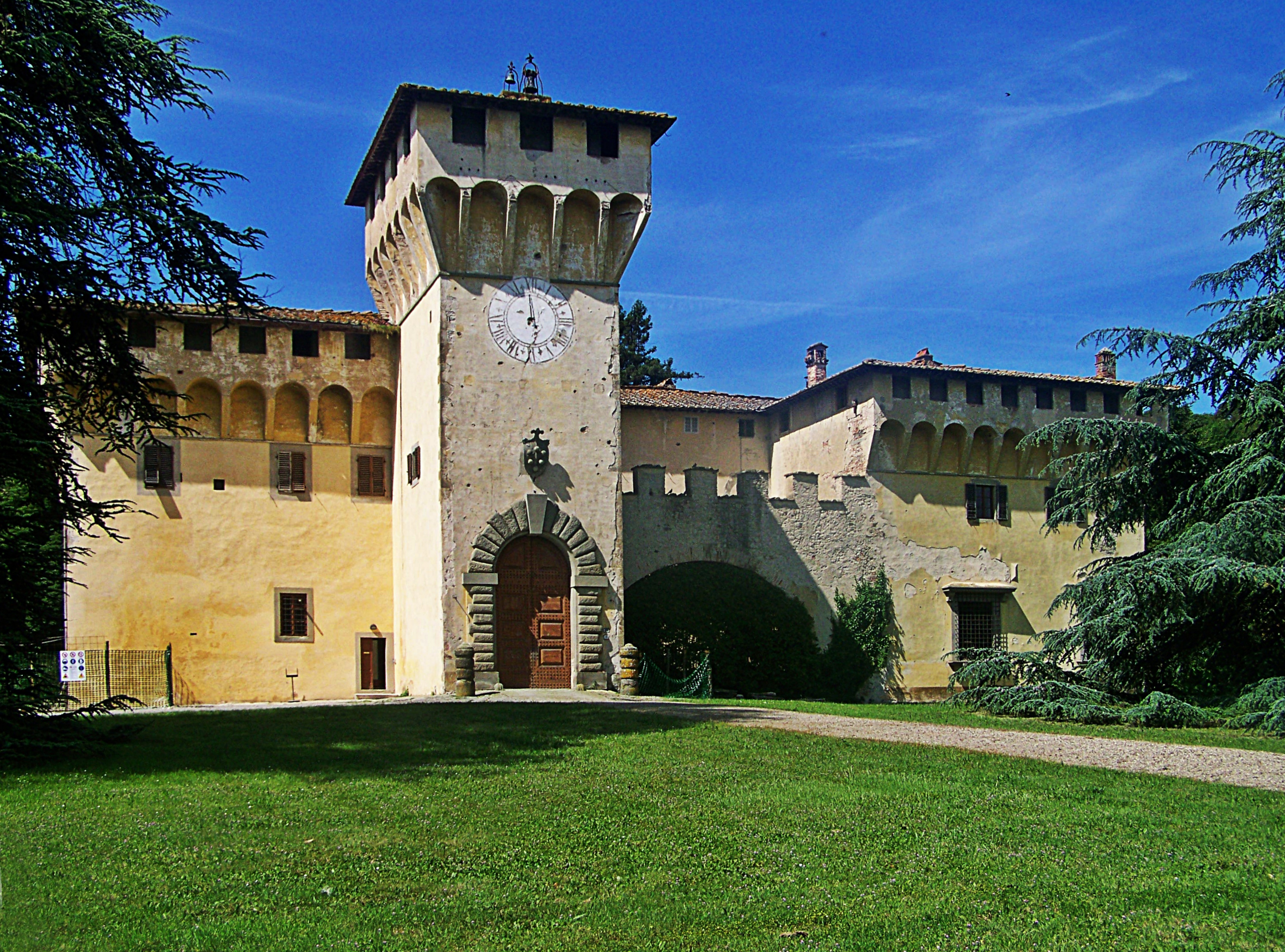
Villa di Cafaggiolo.

Barberino di Mugello is a comune (municipality) in the Metropolitan City of Florence in the Italian region Tuscany, located about 25 kilometres (16 mi) north of Florence. Barberino di Mugello borders the following municipalities: Calenzano, Cantagallo, Castiglione dei Pepoli, Firenzuola, San Piero a Sieve, Scarperia, Vaiano, Vernio.

Sights include the Villa Medici of Cafaggiolo.

== Twin towns ==
- Laurenzana, Italy
