= Gerini =

Gerini is a surname of Italian origin. Notable people with the surname include:

- Alessandro Gerini (1897–1990) Italian Senator and businessman
- Antonio Gerini (1934–2017), Italian actor, grandson of Alessandro Gerini, known for being one of the protagonists of the famous Dolce Vita in Rome
- Claudia Gerini (born 1971), Italian actress
- Gerino Gerini (1928–2013), Italian racing driver
- Gerolamo Emilio Gerini (1860–1913), Italian diplomat and academic
- Marco Gerini (born 1971), Italian water polo player
- Niccolò di Pietro Gerini (c. 1340 – 1414), Italian painter
