= Scarperia e San Piero =

- Comune
- Comune di Scarperia e San Piero
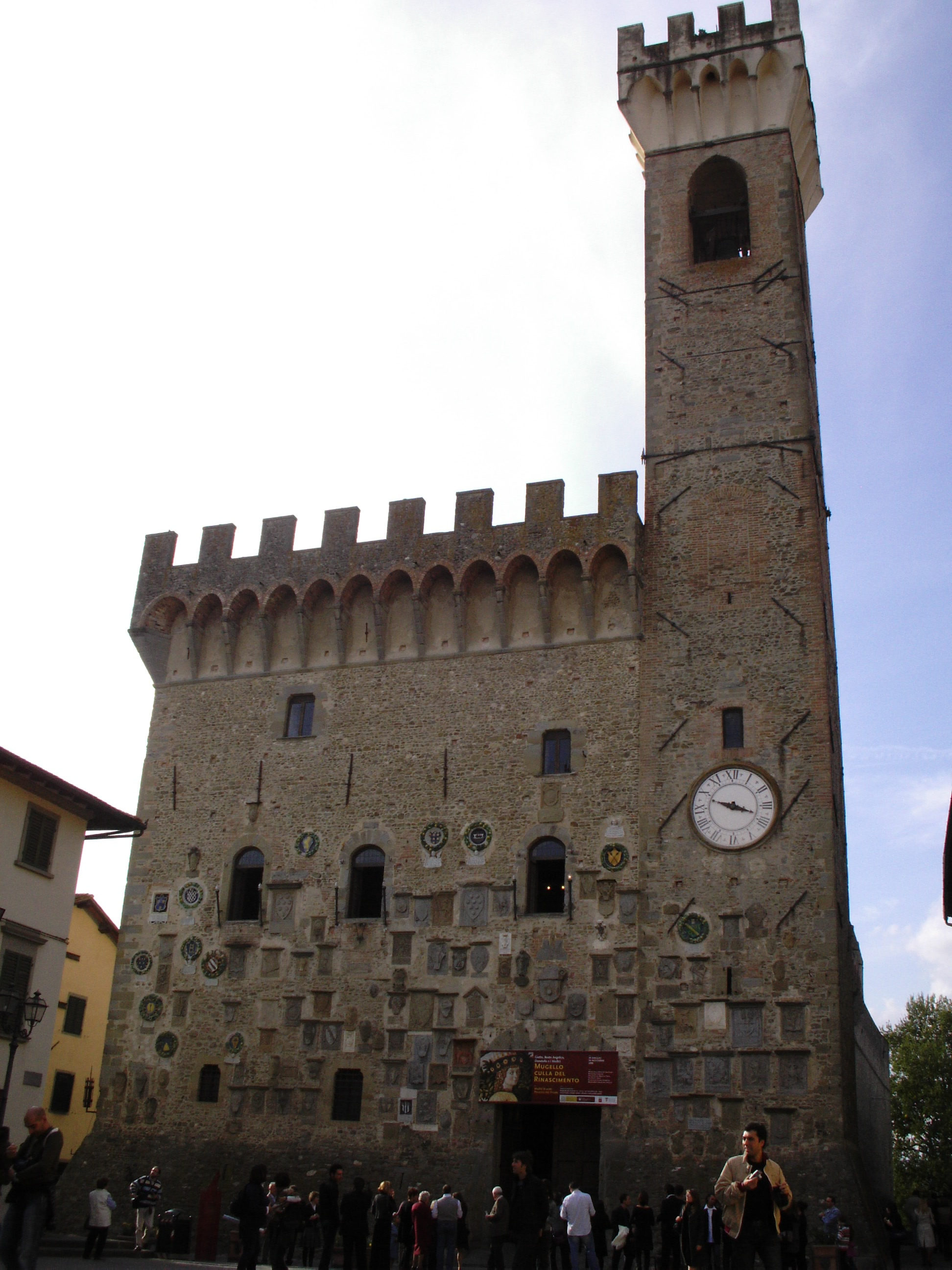

- Location within Italy Location within Tuscany
- Coordinates: 44°0′N 11°21′E
- Country: Italy
- Region: Tuscany
- Metropolitan city: Florence (FI)
- Frazioni: Scarperia, San Piero a Sieve, Sant'Agata, Marcoiano, Ponzalla, Petrona, La Torre, Campomigliaio, San Giusto a Fortuna, Gabbiano, Casenuove, Loli, Tagliaferro,

Government
  - Mayor: Federico Ignesti (Centrosinistra per Scarperia e San Piero)

Area http://www.istat.it/it/archivio/82599
  - Total: 116 km^{2} (45 sq mi)
- Elevation: 292 m (958 ft)

Population (29-02-2024)https://demo.istat.it/app/?a=2024&i=D7B
  - Total: 11,953
  - Density: 103/km^{2} (267/sq mi)
- Demonym(s): Scarperiesi and Sanpierini
- Time zone: UTC+1 (CET)
  - Summer (DST): UTC+2 (CEST)
- Postal code: 50037, 50038
- Dialing code: 055
- ISTAT code: 048053
- Patron saint: St Peter
- Saint day: 29th June
- Website: https://www.comune.scarperiaesanpiero.fi.it/it

Scarperia e San Piero is a comune (municipality) in the Metropolitan City of Florence, in the Italian region Tuscany, located about 25 kilometres (16 mi) northeast of Florence. It was created on 1 January 2014 after the merger of former comuni of Scarperia and San Piero a Sieve. It is one of I Borghi più belli d'Italia ("The most beautiful villages of Italy").

Scarperia is famous for the production of knives by artisanal family companies. Since 2009, it has been the headquarters of La Marzocco Espresso coffee machine company. The village or borgo of Scarperia is best known as the home of the Mugello Circuit which is located nearby, and is home to the Italian motorcycle Grand Prix.

On 13 September 2020, in a revised Formula One calendar (as a result of the Covid-19 pandemic), the first Tuscan Grand Prix took place at the Mugello Circuit, Scarperia, as part of the 2020 Formula One World Championship.
