= Scarperia =

- Frazione
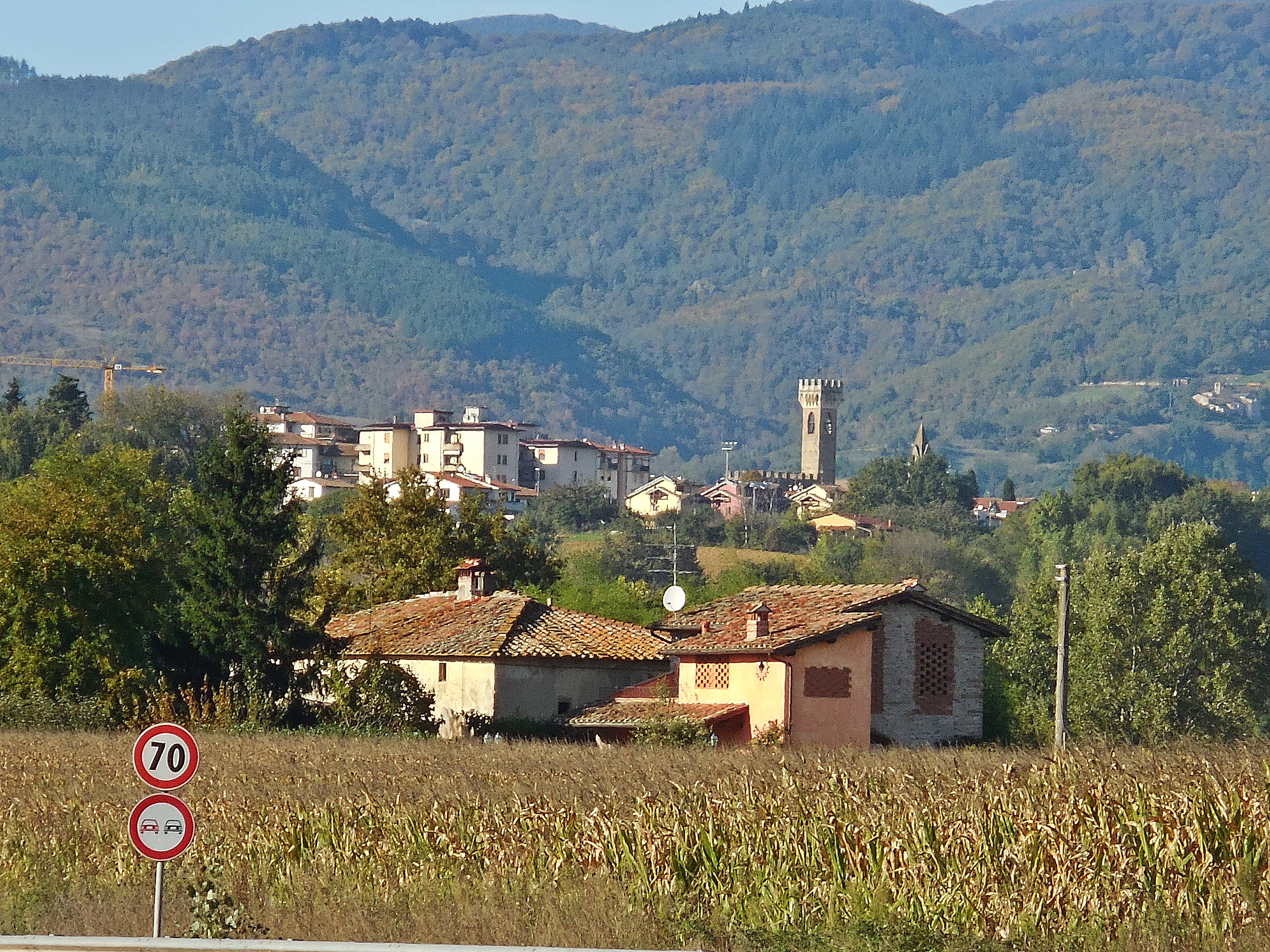

- Location of Scarperia in Italy
- Country: Italy
- Region: Tuscany
- Province: Florence (FI)
- Comune: Scarperia e San Piero
- Time zone: UTC+1 (CET)
  - Summer (DST): UTC+2 (CEST)

Scarperia is a frazione of the comune (municipality) of Scarperia e San Piero, located in the Metropolitan City of Florence, in Tuscany, Italy, about 30 kilometres (19 mi) north of Florence. It was an independent comune until 1 January 2014.

== Main sights ==
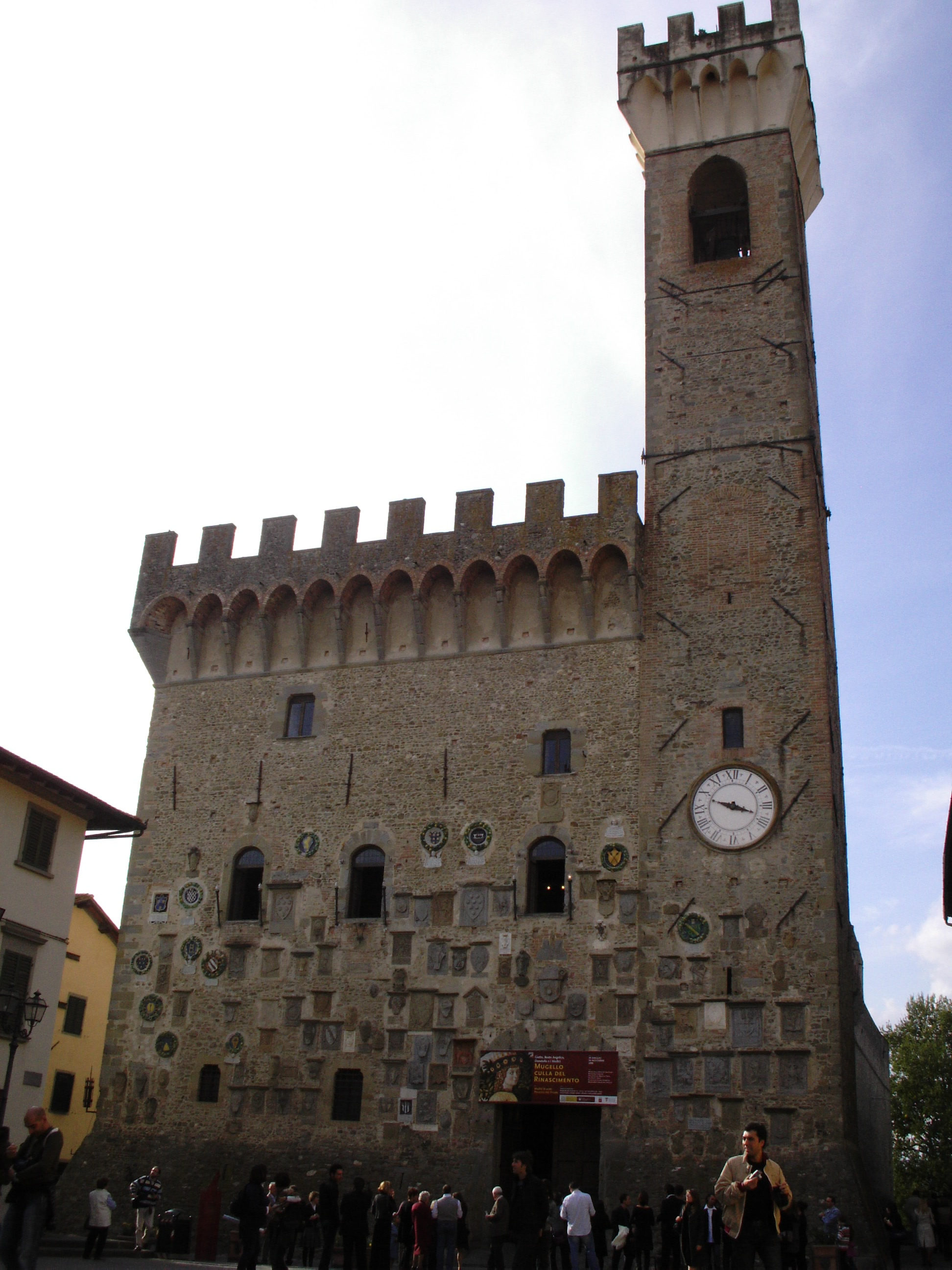
Palazzo dei Vicari in Scarperia

- Chiesa di San Gavino al Cornocchio
- Chiesa di San Giovanni Battista a Senni
- Prepositura dei Santi Jacopo e Filippo
- Oratorio della Madonna dei Terremoti
- Oratorio della Madonna del Vivaio
- Cappella della Madonna di Piazza
- Pieve di Santa Maria a Fagna
- Palazzo dei Vicari (Scarperia)
- Villa Panna
- Villa Il Torrino

== Traditions and sport ==
Scarperia is renowned for the production of ferri taglienti (literally "cutting tools": knives, blades, razors, scissors), which is the main and most specialised craftsmanship in the area.
Every year, on 8 September, the village celebrates the anniversary of its founding, during the event called Diotto.
The Mugello Circuit, home to Grand Prix motorcycle racing, is located in the near surroundings of the village.
