= Sieve (river) =

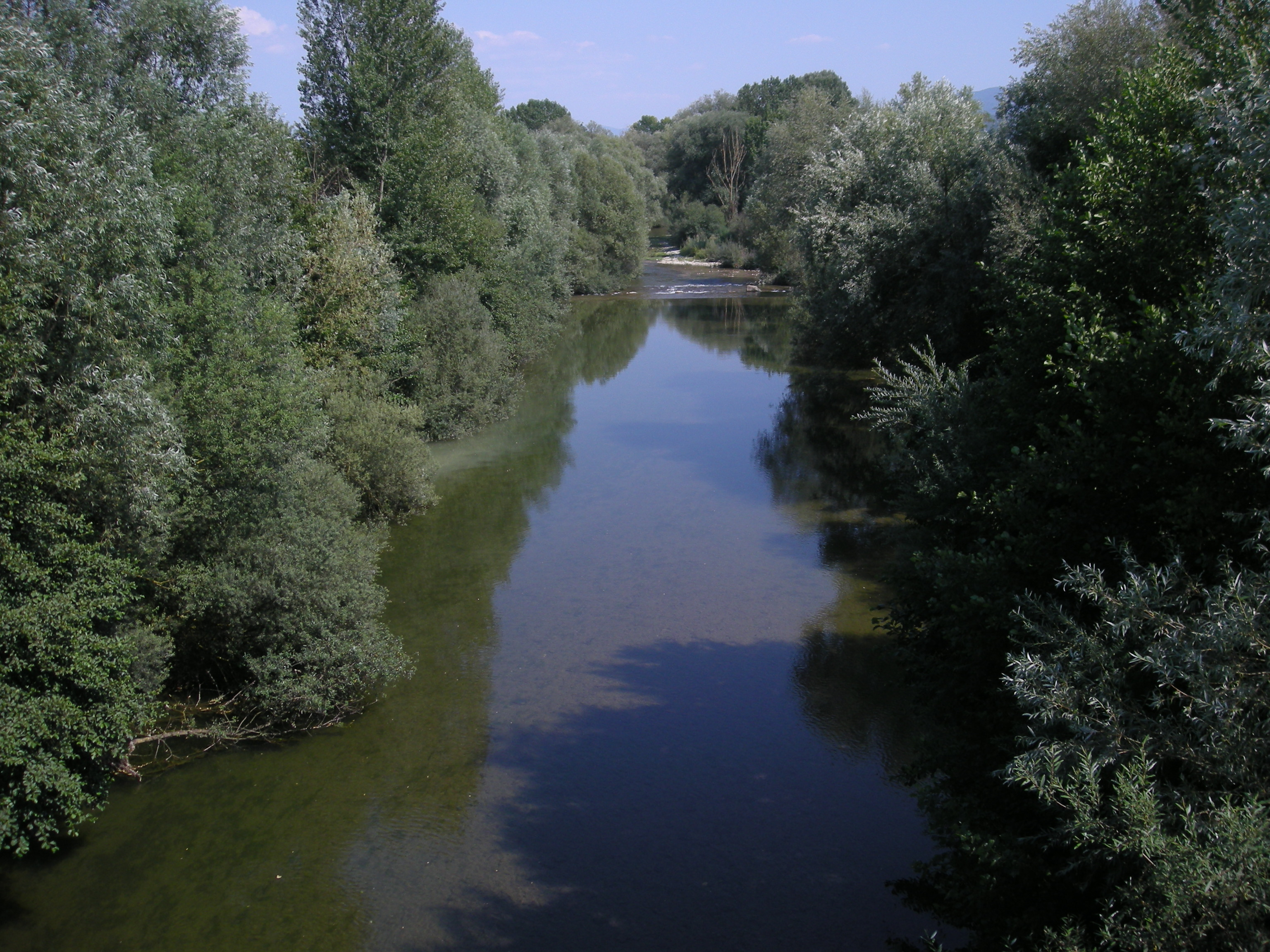

Location
- Country: Italy

Physical characteristics
- Source
  - location: near Futa Pass, Apennines, Italy
  - elevation: 777 m (2,549 ft)
- Mouth
  - location: Arno
  - coordinates: 43.7703°N 11.4412°E
- Length: 58 km (36 mi)
- Basin size: 840 km^{2} (320 sq mi)

Basin features
- Progression: Arno→ Tyrrhenian Sea

The Sieve is a river in Italy. It is a tributary of the Arno, into which it flows at Pontassieve after a course of 62 km. The Sieve rises in the Tuscan-Emilian Apennines, near the Futa Pass, at 930 m of elevation.

The territory in which it flows is known in Italian as Valdisieve. In the Italian language, the name "Sieve" is feminine, and is therefore referred to as La Sieve.

== Notes ==
Media related to Sieve River at Wikimedia Commons
