= Ernst Moritz Geyger =

German artist

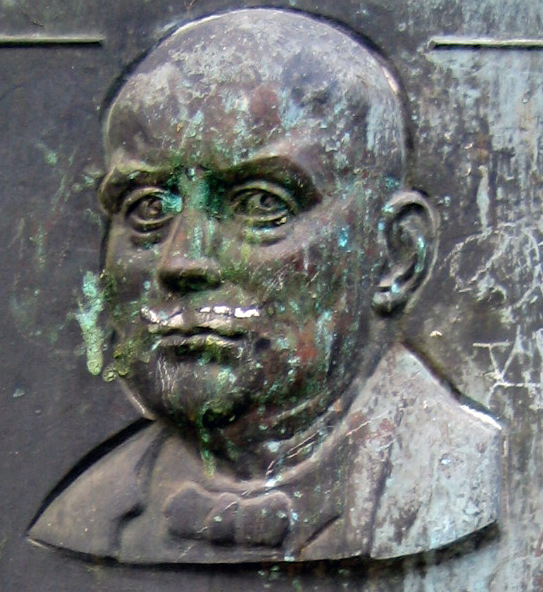
- Born: 1861; Berlin, Kingdom of Prussia
- Died: 1941 (aged 79–80); Marignolle, Kingdom of Italy
- Education: Prussian Academy of Arts
- Notable work: Bear Fountain in Wrocław
- Movement: Modernism

Ernst Moritz Geyger (1861 – 1941) was a German artist known for his work in sculpture, painting and engraving. His work is included in the collections of the Los Angeles County Museum of Art, the Carnegie Museum of Art and the Fine Arts Museums of San Francisco.

== Gallery ==
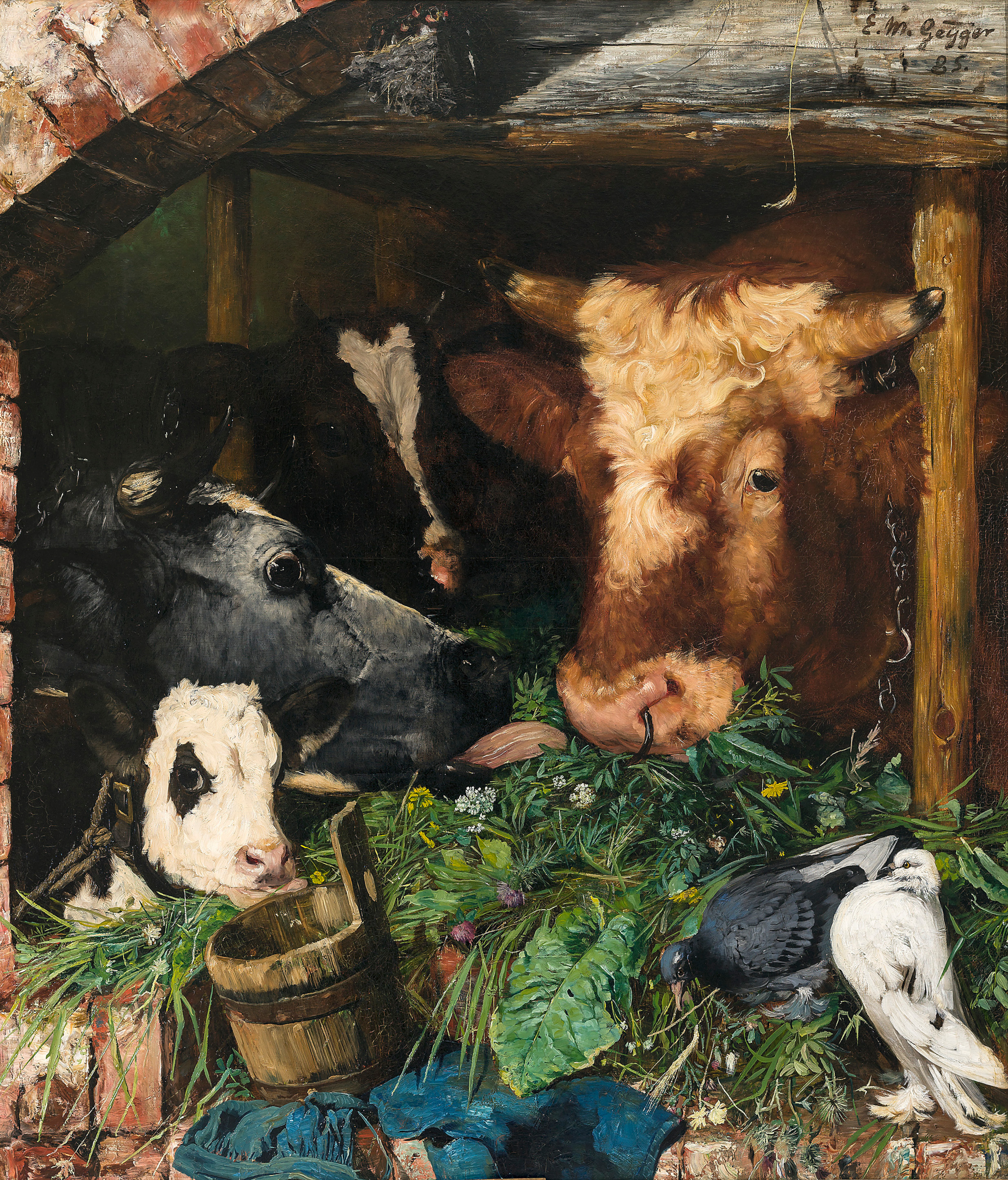
Viehfütterung, 1885

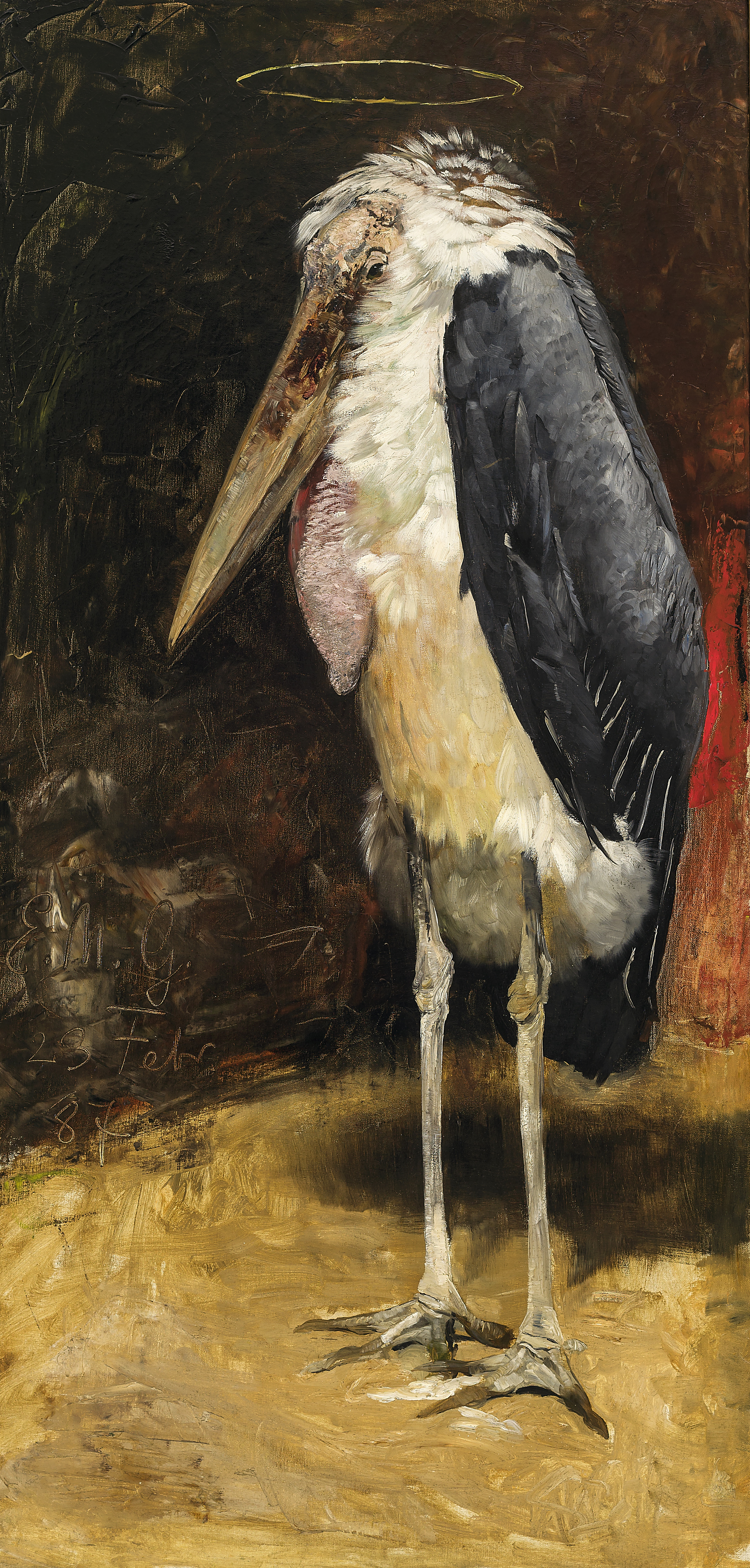
Die Weisheit, 1887

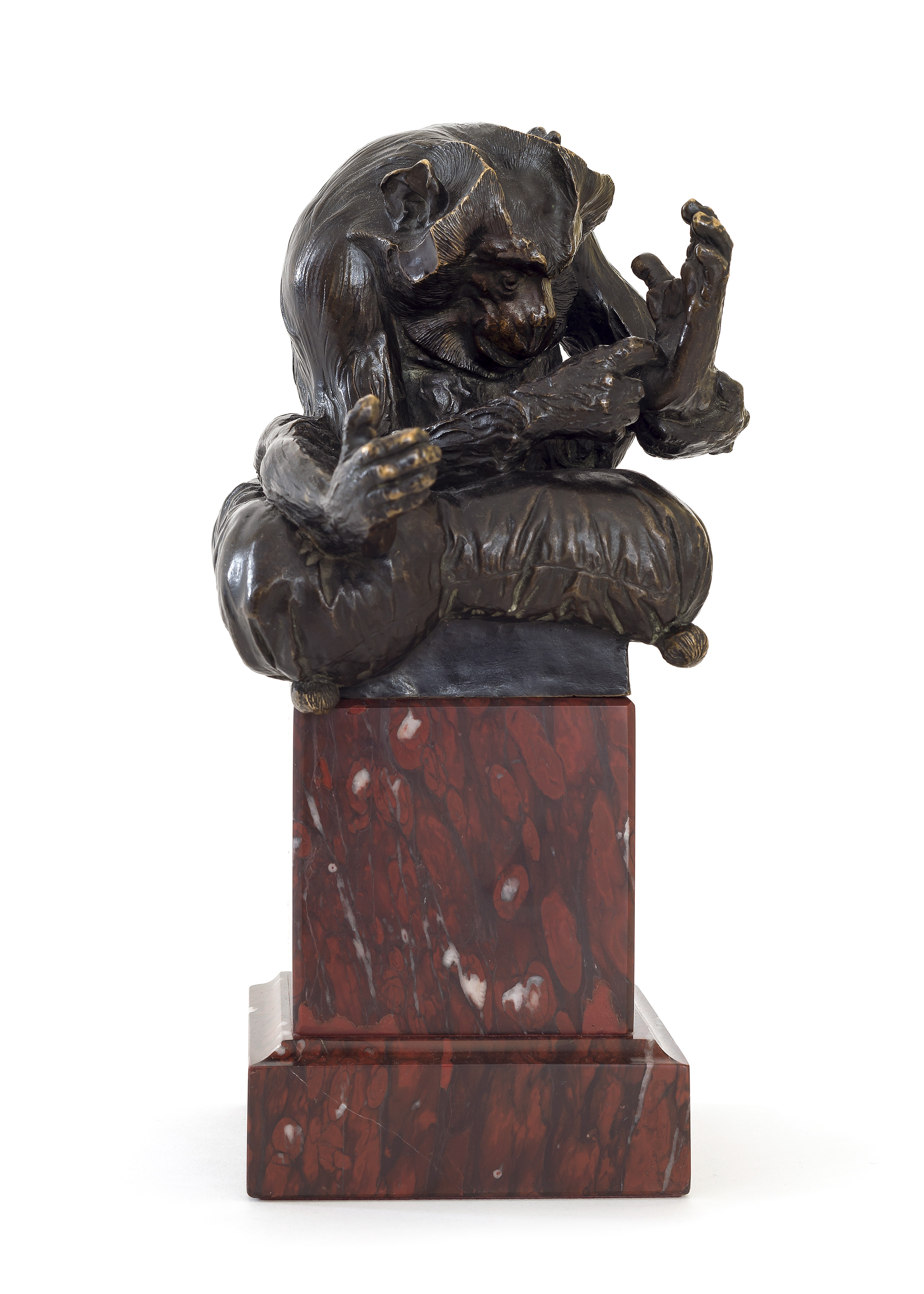
Der Dornauszieher, 1891
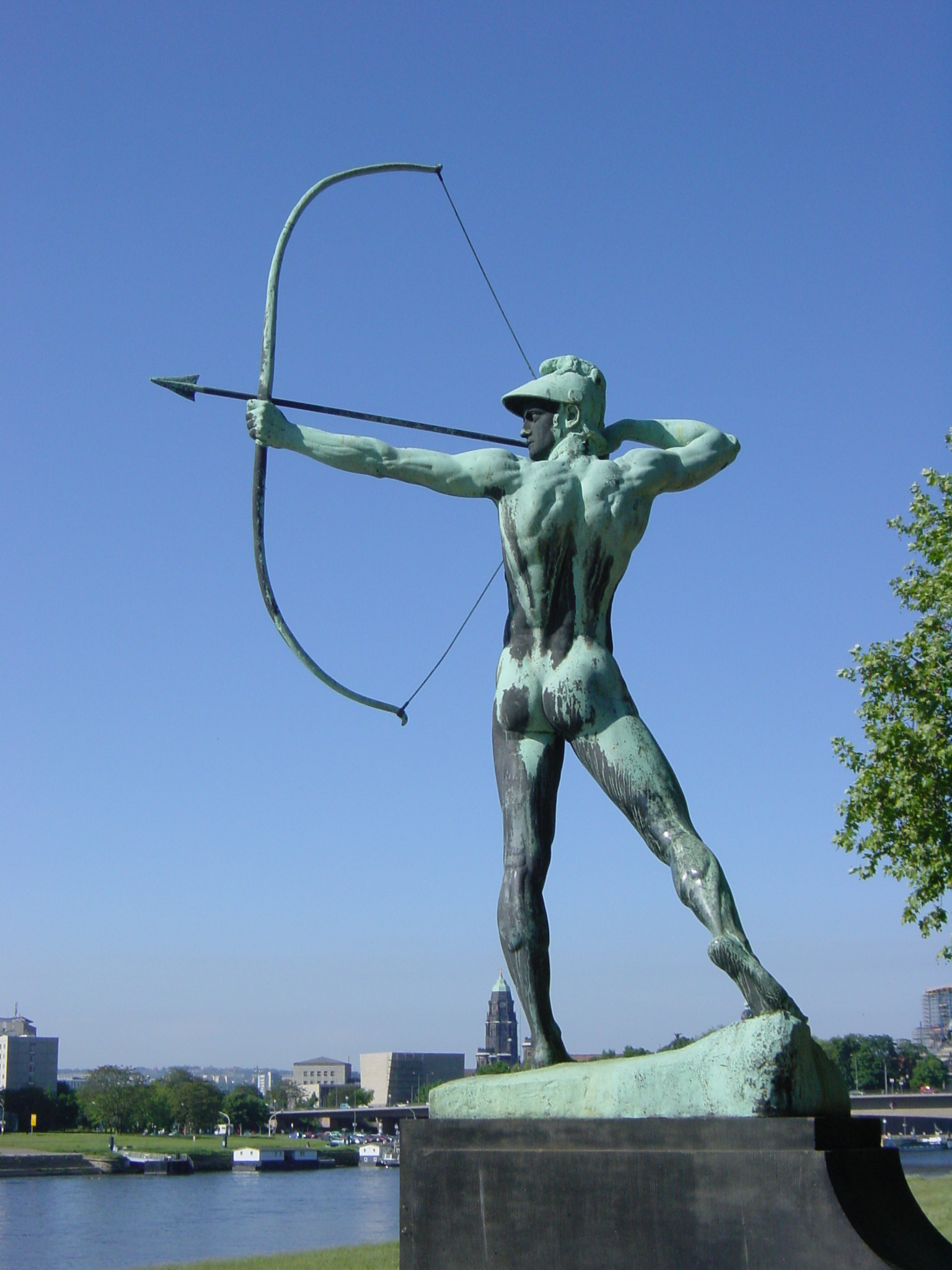
Bogenschütze, Dresden

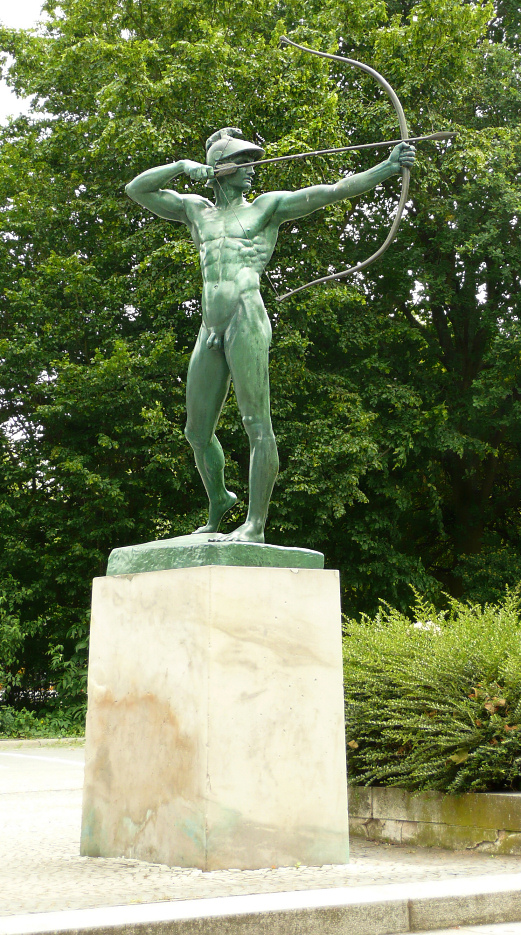
Bogenschütze at Trammplatz in Hannover

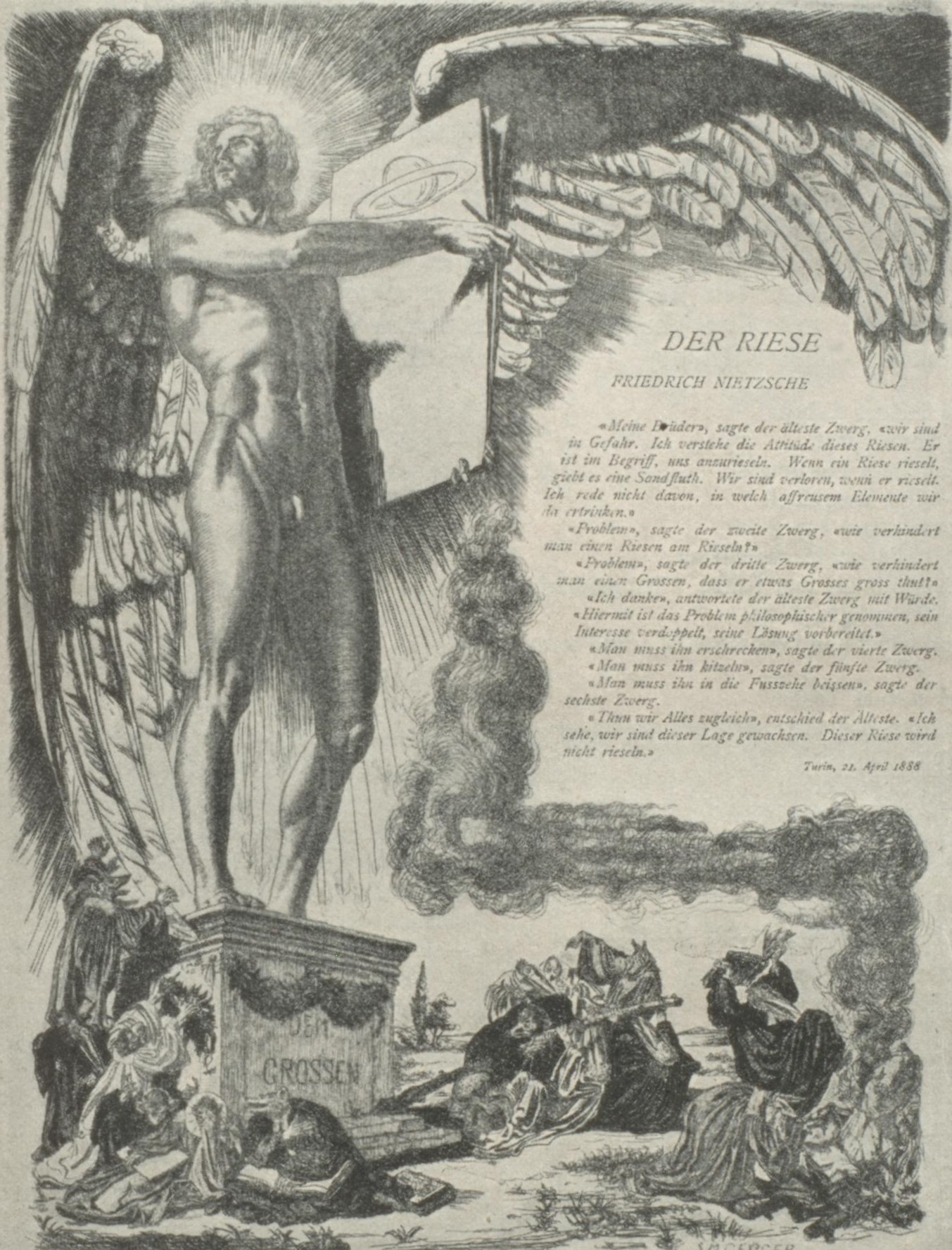
Illustration of Friedrich Nietzsche, Der Riese (1895)
