= Piast Brewery =

Former brewery in Wrocław, Poland

Coordinates: 51°7′43.93″N 17°3′10.42″E

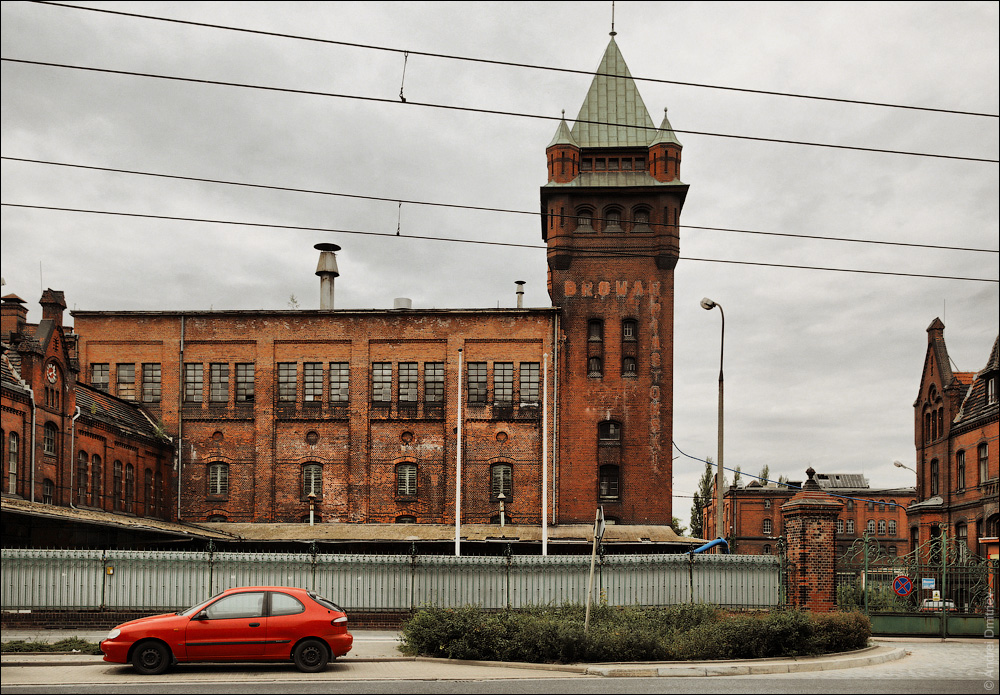
Piast Brewery in Wroclaw

Piast Brewery is a defunct brewery, located in Wrocław, Poland. It was founded in 1872, when the city of Wrocław, known as Breslau, belonged to the German Empire.

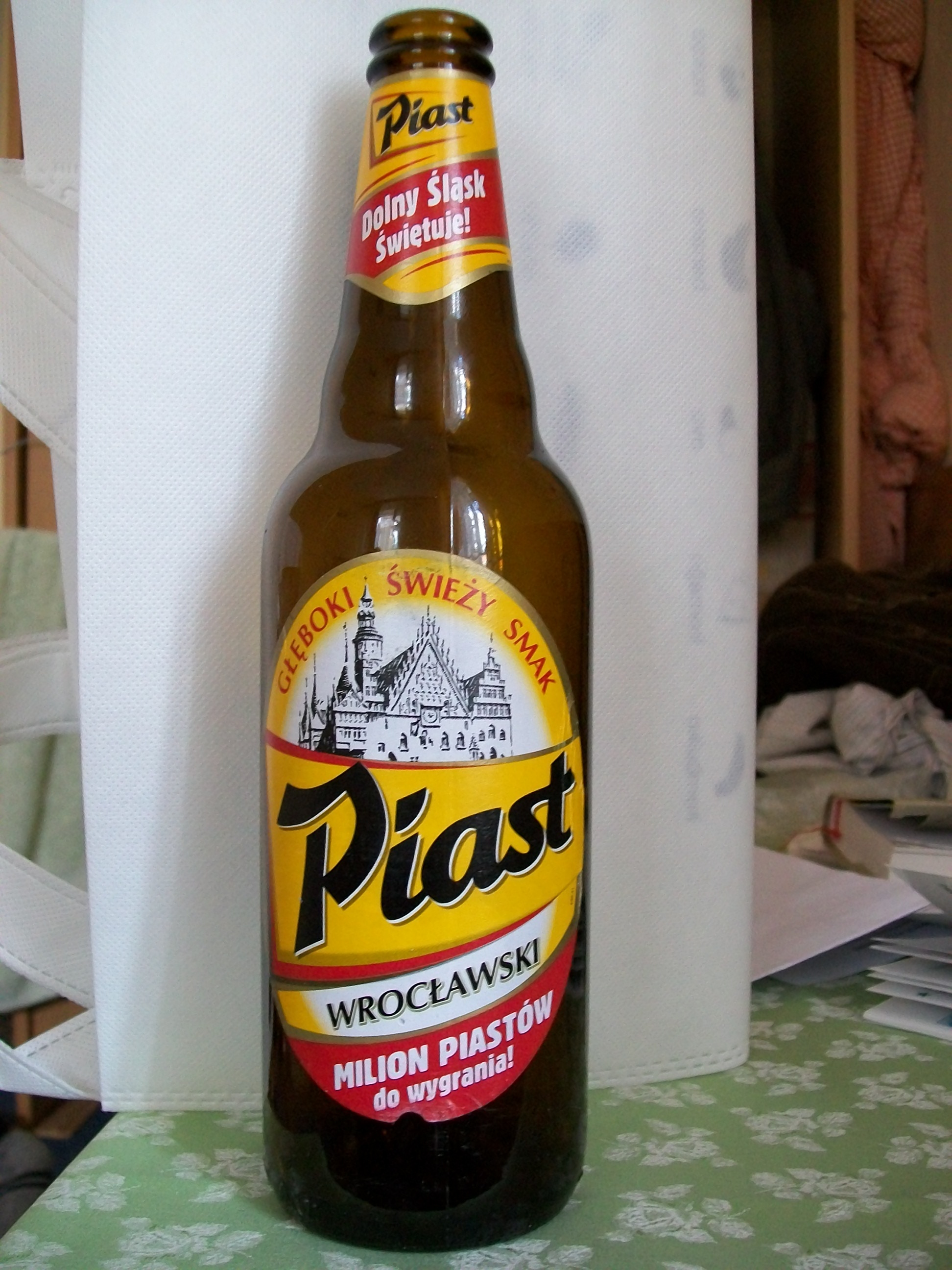
Piast beer

The brewery was founded by Carl Scholtz, and until 1910, its name was Brauerei Pfeifferhof Carl Scholtz. By 1945, the enterprise changed names three times:

- Schultheiss`Brauerei AG, Abt. V (ZBv.Berlin) (1910–1920),
- Schultheiss- Patzenhofer- Brauerei AG, Abt. V (1920–1938),
- Schultheiss- Brauerei AG Berlin, Abt. Breslau (1938–1945).

In 1945, when Breslau was annexed by Poland, the brewery took on the name Piast Brewery, honoring the Piast dynasty, the first Polish historical Royal dynasty that ruled the country from its beginnings until 1370. The name was not changed till 2005. Right after World War II, the production process was run by Polish brewmasters from the brewery of Lwów, who had been ordered to leave their native city and move to the Recovered Territories. In 1951, Piast Brewery produced 350 000 hectolitres of beer and 9 000 tons of malt annually.

In 1991, the brewery became part of Wrocław's company Zakłady Piwowarskie S.A., and on January 23, 1996, it was purchased for $9 500 000 by Ryszard Varisella. In November 2001, it was bought by Carlsberg Polska, and in 2004, brewing of beer was terminated.

== Lofts ==
Several old buildings were destroyed in 2008. Three main buildings of the brewery, which in 2004 were entered in the register of monuments will be restored and their interiors converted into loft apartments named Browary Wrocławskie.

== See also ==
- Polish beer
