= Villa di Marignolle =

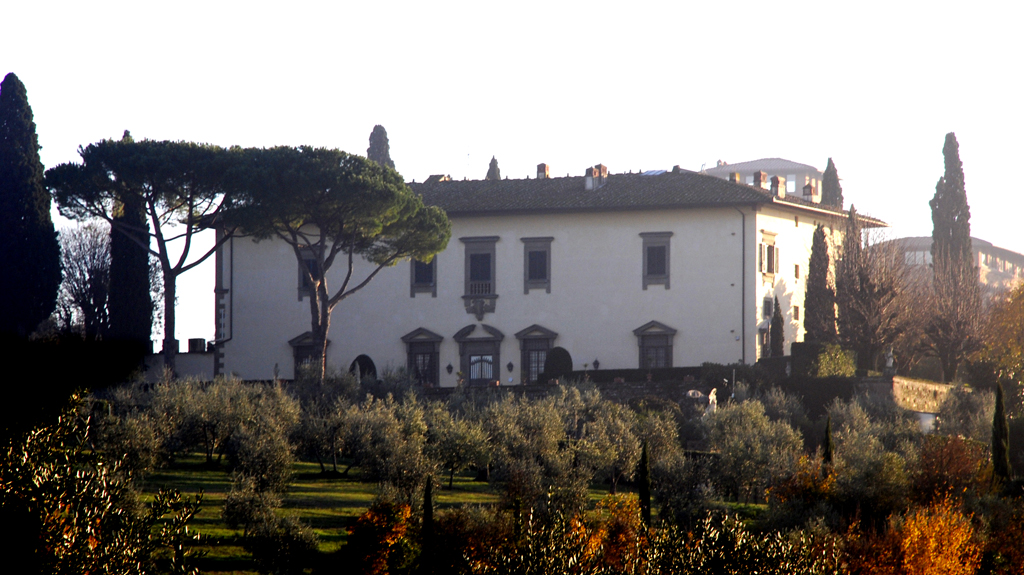
- Interactive map of the Villa di Marignolle area

General information
- Location: via Ferrone 1, Florence, Italy
- Coordinates: 43.7530°N 11.2171°E
- Owner: private owner

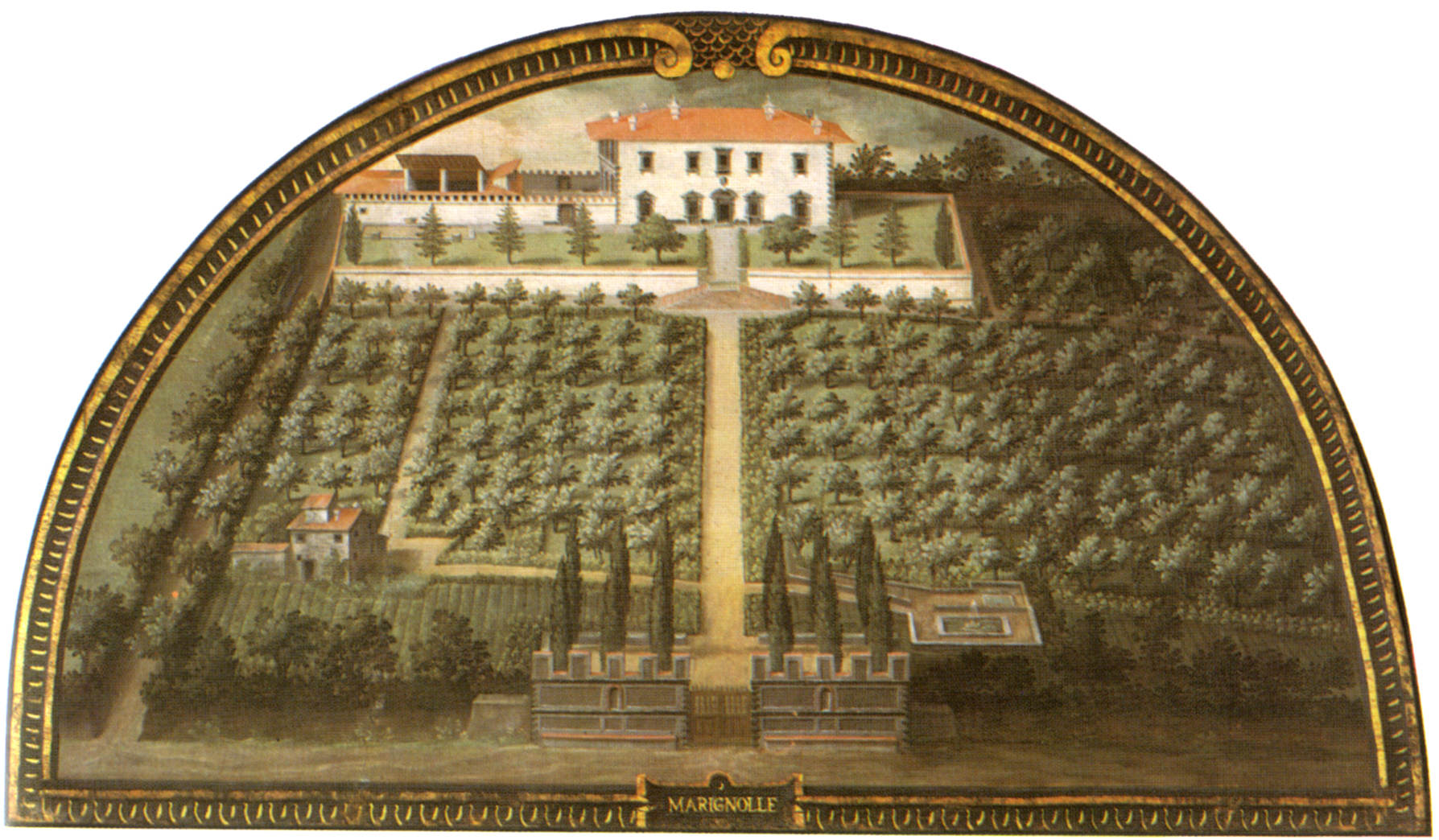
The villa in about 1600, lunette painted by Giusto Utens in the Villa di Artimino

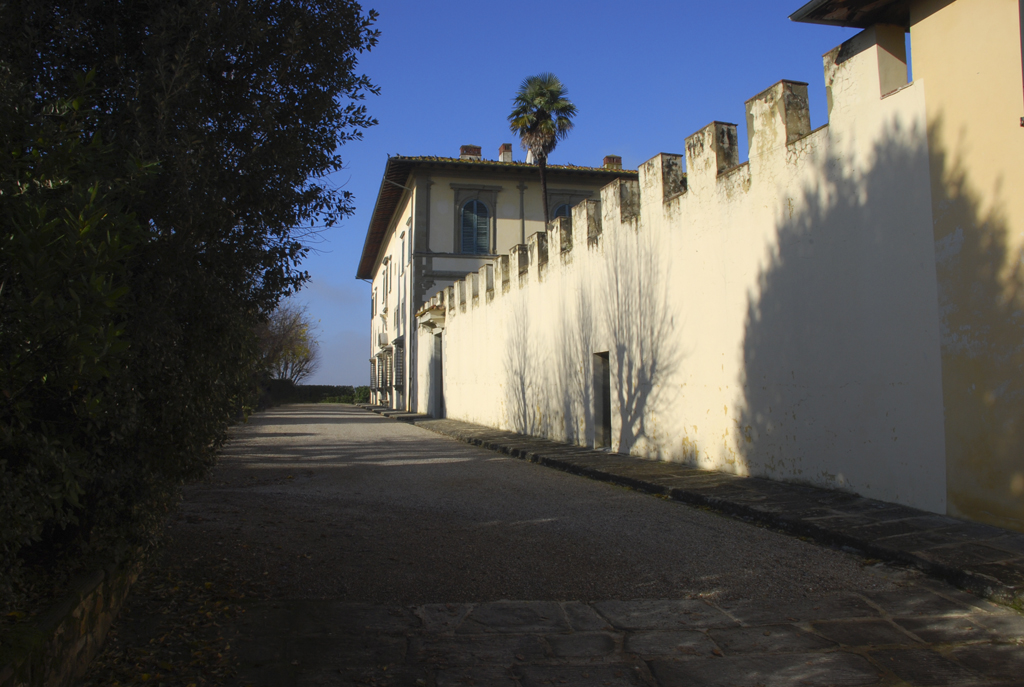
Exterior wall of the estate

The Villa di Marignolle is a Medici villa in the hills between Galluzzo and Soffiano, in the south-western suburbs of the comune of Florence, Tuscany, central Italy. It passed into the hands of the Medici family after the Pucci Conspiracy, when it was confiscated from Lorenzo di Piero Ridolfi by Francesco I de' Medici, Grand Duke of Tuscany. Francesco passed it to his illegitimate son Antonio.

It is one of the many villas of the Medici family of which Giusto Utens painted lunettes in the Villa di Artimino between 1599 and 1602. It is not one of the fourteen sites which, since 2013, together make up the UNESCO World Heritage Site, the Medici Villas and Gardens in Tuscany.

As of 2025, it remains a private residence.
