= List of Neo-Latin authors =

This is a list of authors writing fiction, in prose or poetry, in a Neo-Latin idiom, highlighted by academics working in Neo-Latin studies as outstanding or important for their contribution to poetry, Latitinity, drama, or other prose. They are often the focus of current research in that field.

Neo-Latin was the first major international, standardised linguistic vehicle for printed works in Europe, and the dominant medium for academic and religious discourse during the sixteenth and start of the seventeenth century. As an international language, Neo-Latin authors often knew the works of contemporaries in other countries, as well as having common cultural references, through both Classical Roman and Greek texts, and later Christian works. While many Neo-Latin authors and works are less well known now, study of their works is important to understand the development of science, literature and vernacular literary cultures.

Neo-Latin literature and its notable authors are explored and identified in a number of standard reference works.

== Authors of Neo-Latin works ==
Sortable list of Neo-Latin authors
Name	Latin name	Dates	Nationality	Notes	Genre
Pedro Pablo de Acevedo	Petrus Paulus Acevedo	1522–73	Spanish		
Joseph Addison	Iosephus Addison	1672–1719	English		Drama, poetry
William Alabaster	Guillelmus Alabaster	1444–84	English	His Roxana (c. 1595) rated as next after Milton by Johnson	Drama
Heinrich Cornelius Agrippa	Cornelius Agrippa ab Nettesheym	1486–1535	German	De Occulta Philosophia libri III	Occult
Roelof Huesman	Rodolphus Agricola	1444–84	Dutch	De inventione dialectica (1479)	Logic
Leon Battista Alberti	Leo Baptista Albertus	1404–72	Italian	De pictura, De re aedificatoria, Ludi rerum mathematicarum, De componendis cifris; Momus	Technical works, satire
Andrea Alciato	Andreas Alciatus	1492–1550	Italian	Viri Clarissimi D. Andreae Alciati Iurisconsultiss. Mediol. Ad D. Chonradum Peutingerum Augustanum, Iurisconsultum Emblematum Liber	Law
Marcantonio Aldegati	Marcus Antonius de Aldegatis	1480–90			
Ulisse Aldrovandi	Ulysses Aldrovandus	1522–1605	Italian	Ornithologiae, Monstrorum Historia	Natural history
Francisco Xavier Alegre	Franciscus Xaverius Alegrius	1729–98	Italian	Nysus	Classics; theology, history, mathematics
Jean le Rond d' Alembert		1717–83			
Andrea Ammonio		1478–1517			
Johann Valentin Andreae	Johannes Valentinus Andreae	1586–1654			
Publio Fausto Andrelini		1462–1518			
Girolamo Angeriano	Hieronymus Angerinaus	1470–1535	Italian		
Giano Anisio	Janus Anisius	1465-1540	Italian		
Annius of Viterbo	Annius	1432–1502	Italian		
Ludovico Ariosto		1474–1533			
Francesco Arsilli		1479–1540	Italian		
Johannes Aventinus		1477–1534			
Francis Bacon		1561–1626	English		
Jacob Balde		1604–68			
Matteo Bandello		1485–1561	Italian		
Ermolao Barbaro	Hermolaus Barbarus	1453/1454–1492	Italian	Castigationes Plinianae	
Francesco Barbaro		1390–1454	Italian	De re uxori	
Maffeo Barberini		1568–1644	Italian		
John Barclay		1582–1621	Scottish		
Kaspar van Baerle	Caspar Barlaeus	1584–1648	Dutch		
Adriaan van Baarland	Hadrianus Barlandus	1486–1538	Dutch		
Kaspar von Barth		1587–1658	German	Adversariorum commentatiorum libri lx	
Thomas Bartholin		1616–80			
Gasparino Barzizza		1360–1431			
Basinio Basini		1425–57	Italian		
François Baudouin		1520–73			
Dominique Baudier	Dominicus Baudius	1561–1613			
	Bernardus Bauhusius	1575–1614	Dutch		
Heinrich Bebel		1472–1518			
Antonio Beccadelli		1394–1471	Italian	Hermaphroditus; De dictis et factis Alphonsi regis; founded the Academia Neapolitana	
Daniel Beckher		1594–1655	German		
Pietro Bembo	Bembus	1470–1547	Italy		Poetry
Francesco Benci	Franciscus Bencius	1542–94	Italian		
Jan Benningh	Janus Bodecherus Banningius	1606–42			
Matthias Bernegger		1582–1640			
Jacob Bernoulli		1655–1705			
Filippo Beroaldo		1453–1505			
Sixt Birck	Sixtus Betuleius	1501–54			
Théodore de Bèze	Theodorus Beza	1519–1605			
Jakob Bidermann		1577–1639			
Flavio Biondo		1392–1463		De Roma instaurata; De Roma triumphante	History
Thomas Bisse		1675–1731			
Johannes Bissel	Ioannes Bisselius	1601–82	German		
Pierre de Blarru		1437–1510	French		
Giovanni Boccaccio		1313–75		Genealogie deorum gentilium	Mythography
Jean Bodin		1530–96			
Hector Boethius		1465–1536			
Etienne de La Boétie		1530–1563		Poemata, 1571	Poetry
Giovanni Bona		1609–74			
Antonio Bonfini		1434–1503	Italian (working in Hungary)	Rerum ungaricarum decades	History
Giovanni Francesco Bordini	Johannes Franciscus Bordinus	1536–1609	Italian		
Nicolas Bourbon		1503–1550			
Mark Alexander Boyd	Marcus Alexander Bodius	1562–1601			
Alessandro Braccesi		1445–1503			
Jacopo Bracciolini		1442–78	Italian		
Poggio Bracciolini	Poggius Florentinus	1380–1459	Italian	Facetiae; De avaritia	Hunour, morality
Aurelio Lippo Brandolini		1454–97			
Sebastian Brant		1457–1521			
	Gabriël Mudaeus Brechtanus	1502–1560			
John Bridges		1536–1618			
John Brinsley		1566–1624			
Leonardo Bruni	Leonardus Aretinus	1370–1444			
Giordano Bruno		1548–1600			
George Buchanan		1506–82	Scottish	Tutored James I, greatest Scottish Neo-Latin poet	Poetry
Guillaume Budé	Guilielmus Budaeus	1467–1540		De asse (1515); De philologia, (1532); De transitu Hellenismi ad Christianismum (1535).	Classical studies and philology
Gabriel Bugnot		1673 (d)			
Ghislain Bulteel	Gislenus Bultelius	1555–1611			
Pieter Burman	Petrus Burmannus	1668–1741	Dutch		
Joannes Burmeister		1576–1638	German		
Ambrogio da Calepino	Ambrosius Calepinus	1453–1511	Italian		
William Camden		1551–1623		Works across many different prose genres	Non-fiction
Tommaso Campanella		1568–1639			
Thomas Campion		1567–1620			
Pietro Andrea Canonieri		1639 (d)			
Willem Canter	Gulielmus Canterus	1542–1575	Dutch		
Gerolamo Cardano	Hieronymus Cardanus	1501–76			
Fulvio Cardulo		1526–91			
Pietro Carmeliano	Petrus Carmelianus	1451–1527	Italian		
Isaac Casaubon		1559–1614			
	Petrus Castellanus	1582–1632	Dutch		
Lapo da Castiglionchio		1316–81	Italy		Poetry
Baldassare Castiglione		1478–1529			
Nicolas Caussin		1583–1651			
Conrad Celtis		1459–1508			
Tommaso Ceva		1648–1737			
Thomas Chaloner		1521–65			
François Champion de Cicé		1666–1715			
John Cheke		1514–57			
Thomas Chaundler		1418–90	English		Academic
David Chytraeus		1530–1600			
Grzegorz Knapski		1564–1638			
	Carolus Clusius	1526–1609	Dutch		Botany
John Colet		1467–1519	English	Erasmus' circle	
Urceo Codro	Antonius Codrus Urceus	1446–1500			
Francesco Colonna	Franciscus Columna	1433–1527			
Benedetto Colucci		1438-1506			
Natalis Comes		1520–1582	Italian	Mythologiae (1567)	Mythology
Antonio Schinella Conti		1677–1749			
Giovanni Conversini		1343–1408			
	Janus Cornarius	1500–58	German (Saxony)		
Mario Corrado		1508–1575	Italian	De lingua Latina (1569), De copia Latini sermonis (1582)	Latin composition
Tommaso Corréa		1536–95			
Gregorio Correr		1409–64			
Paolo Cortesi	Paulus Cortesius	1465–1510	Italian		
	Laurentius Corvinus	1465–1527			
Giovanni Cotta	Iohannes Cotta	1480–1510	Italy		Poetry
Abraham Cowley		1618–67			
Richard Crashaw		1613–49			
Jean Crespin		1520–72			
Lodrisio Crivelli	Leodrisius Cribellus	1412–65	Italian		
Luis da Cruz	Ludovicus Crucius	1542–1604	Portuguese		Poet
	Petrus Cunaeus	1586–1638			
Giacomo Curlo	Jacobus Curulus	1423–67			
Anne Le Fèvre Dacier		1647–1720			
Anton van Dale	Antonius van Dale	1638–1708	Dutch		
Jan Dantyszek	Ioannes Dantiscus	1485–1548			
Giovanni Darcio	Johannes Darcaeus	1510–1554			
Agostino Dati		1420–78			
Carlo Roberto Dati		1619–76			
Leonardo Dati		1360–1425			
Angelo Decembrio		1415–67			
Nicolas Denisot		1515–59			
Francesco Diedo		1435–84			
Etienne Dolet		1577–1632		Burned at the stake for pro-Reformation views	Ciceronian stylist
Caspar Dornau	Dornavius	d. 1546			
Maarten van Dorp	Martinus Dorpius	1485–1525	Dutch		Drama
	Janus Dousa	1545–1604			
Thomas Draxe		1618 (d)			
William Drummond		1585–1649			
William Drury		1584–1643			
Jean Du Bellay		1493–1560			
Joachim Du Bellay		1522–1560			
András Dugonics		1740–1818			
Jacques Dupuy	Jacobus Puteanus	1591–1656	French		
Pierre Dupuy	Puteanus	1582–1651			
Paolo Emili	Paulus Aemilius Veronensis	1460–1529	Italian		
Gerrit Gerritszoon	Desiderius Erasmus	1466–1536	Dutch		
Anton Wilhelm Ertl		1654–1715			
Henri Estienne	Henricus Stephanus	1470–1520			
Leonhard Euler		1707–83			
Georg Fabricius		1516–71			
Bartolomeo Facio		1400–57			
Vittorino da Feltre		1378–1448			
Giovanni Battista Ferrari	Johannes Baptista Ferrarius	1502 (d)			
Marsilio Ficino		1433–99			
Francesco Filelfo		1398–1481		Sphortias; De morali disciplina	Poetry, philosophy
Gian Maria Filelfo	Ioannes Marius Philelphus	1426–80	Italian		
Martino Filetico	Martinus Phileticus	1430–90	Italian		
Payne Fisher	Paganus Piscator	1616–93			
Teofilo Folengo		1491–1544		Liber macaronices 1517, 1521	Comic / macaronic poetry
James Foulis			Scottish	First major Scottish Neo-Latin poet	Poetry
Marcantonio Flaminio		1498–1550	Italian		Poetry
Francesco Florio		1428–83	Italian		
Girolamo Fracastoro		1478–1553	Italian	Widely imitated	Poetry
Francesco Franchini	Franciscus Franchinus	1500–59			
Abraham Fraunce		1558–1633			
André des Freux	Andreas Frusius	1510–56	French		
Nicodemus Frischlin		1547–90			
Gemma Frisius		1508–1555	Dutch		Geography
Tito Livio Frulovisi		1420–50	Italian		History
William Gager		1555–1622	English	Most notable English dramatist	Drama
Luigi Galvani	Aloisius Galvanus	1737–98	Italian		Physics
Giovanni Garzoni		1419–1505	Italian		Various
Johannes Gast	Johannes Gastius	1500–52	Swiss		
Pierre Gassendi		1592–1655	French		Astronomer, mathematician
Niccolò Partenio Giannettasio	Nicolaus Parthenius Giannettasius	1648–1715	Italian		
Gian Matteo Giberti	Joannes Matthaeus Gibertus	1495–1543			
Paolo Giovio	Paulus Jovius	1483–1552	Italian	Historiarum sui temporis libri XLV (1552) (A History of our times; De viris et foeminis aetate nostra florentibus (Notable Men and Women of our Time)	History
Lilio Gregorio Giraldi		1479–1552			
Wilhelm Gnapheus	Gulielmus Gnapheus	1493–1568	Dutch		
Samuel Gott		1614–71			
Luis de Granada		1505–88			
Thomas Gray		1716–71			
Jakob Gretser		1562–1625			
Nicholas Grimald		1519–62			
Johann Friedrich Gronovius		1611–1671			
Willem de Groot		1597–1662	Dutch		
	Hugo Grotius	1583–1645	Dutch		Diplomatic relations; poetry
	Nicolaus Grudius	1504–1570	Dutch		
Battista Guarini		1538–1612	Italian		
Guarino da Verona	Guarinus Veronensis	1374–1460	Italian		
Bernardo Guglielmini	Guilielminus	1693–1769			
François Guyet		1575–1655			
Walter Haddon		1515–1572			Poetry, theology, epitaphs
Joseph Hall		1574–1656			
Walter Harris		1686–1761	Irish		
Gabriel Harvey		c. 1552 – c. 1631	English		
Jan van Havre	Johannes Havraeus	1551–1625			
Gerard Nicolaas Heerkens	Marius Curillus	1726–1801			
	Daniel Heinsius	1580–1655	Dutch		Poetry
Nicholaas Heinsius	Nicholaus Heinsius	?	Dutch		Poetry
George Herbert		1593–1633			
John Herd		1511–1584		Noted for Historia quattuor regum Angliae: heroico carmine conclusa	Poetry
Eoban Koch	Helius Eobanus Hessus	1488–1540	German		
Ludvig Holberg	Ludovicus Holbergius	1684–1754	Danish / Norwegian		Novels
Michel del' Hôpital	Michael Hospitalius	1504–73			
Lambertus Hortensius		1500–74			
Sidron de Hossche	Sidronius Hosschius	1596–1653			
Pierre-Daniel Huet		1630–1721			
Herman Hugo		1588–1629			
David Hume		1558–1629			
James Hume (mathematician)		1639			
	Nicolaus Hussovianus	1480–1533	Lithuanian		
Ulrich von Hutten		1488–1523			
Christiaan Huygens	Christianus Huygens	1629–1695	Dutch		Mathematics
Luigi Illuminati	Aloisius Illuminati	1881-1962	Italian	Dux populi; Dux militum; Dux Italiae	Poetry, Fascist Poetry
Klemens Janicki	Clemens Ianicius	1516–43			
Christopher Johnson		1536–97			
Samuel Johnson		1709–84			Poetry
Arthur Johnson		1587–1641			
Johannes Kepler		1571–1630			
Johannes Kerckmeister		1450–1500			
David Kinloch		1559–1617			
Joris van Lanckvelt	Georgius Macropedius	1487–1558	Dutch		Drama
Geert De Kremer	Gerardus Mercator	1512–1594	Dutch		Geography
Cristoforo Landino		1424–98		Xandra,Disputationes Camaldulenses	Poetry, theology
Ortensio Lando		1510–58			
Lodovico Lazzarelli		1447–1500			
François Antoine Le Febvre		1678–1737			
Antoine Legrand		1629–99			
John Leland (antiquary)		1503–52			
Bernadino Leo		1572–85 fl.			
Gotthold Ephraim Lessing		1729–81			
	Leonardus Lessius	1554–1623	Dutch		Geography
Michael Lilienthal		1686–1750			
Carl Linnaeus		1707–78			
Lorenzo Lippi		1606–65			
	Justus Lipsius	1547–1606			
Zacharie de Lisieux	Petrus Firmianus, Zacharias Lexoviensis				
William Lily		c. 1468 – c. 1522		Erasmus' circle	
Thomas Linacre		c. 1460 – c. 1524		Erasmus' circle	
John Lloyd		1558–1603			
Jakob Locher	Iacobus Locher; Philomusus	1471–1528			
Peter Lombard		1555–1625			
Christophe de Longueil	Christophorus Longolius	1488–1522			
Antonio Loschi		1368–1441			
Antonio Lovati		1241–1309			
Eilert Lübben	Eilhard Lubinus	1565–1621			
John Lynch	Gratianus Lucius	1599–1677			
Jean Salmon Macrin		1490–1557			
Giovanni Pietro Maffei	Petrus Maffeius	1533–1603			
Antonio Magliabechi		1633–1714			
Paracleto Corneto Malvezzi	Fuscus Paracletus Cornetanus De Malvetiis	1408–87			
Pierre Mambrun	Petrus Mambrunus	1601–61			
Domenico Mancini	Dominicus Mancinus	1434– 1494			
Giannozzo Manetti		1396–1459			
Baptista Mantuanus Baptista Spagnuoli Mantuan	Baptista Mantuanus	1448–1516			
Paolo Marchesi		1460–70 fl.			
Théodore Marcile	Theodorus Marcilius	1548–1617			
Giovanni Mazza	Joannes Mazza	1877–1943	Italian	Italia renata (1930)	Poetry, Fascist Poetry
Clément Marot		1496–1544			
Giovanni Marrasio		1400–1452			
Adriaan Nicolai	Hadrianus Marius	1509–1568	Dutch		Poetry
Michele Marullo	Michael Tarchaniota Marullus	1453–1500			
Jacob Masen	Masenius; Ioannes Semanus	1606–81			
Guillaume Massieu		1665–1722			
Pacifico Massimi	Pacificus Maximus	1410–1506			
Thomas May		1594–1650			
Johann Meder	Johannes Meder	1495 fl.			Sermons
Philip Melanchthon		1497–1560			
Tommaso Melenchino		1500 fl.			
Andrew Melville		1545–1622			
Gilles Ménage		1613–92			
Johann Burkhard	Johannes Burchardus Menckenius	1674–1732			
Nicolas Mercier		1657 d.			
Domenico Migliazza	Dominicus Migliazza	1876–1959	Italian	Roma (1931)	Poetry, Fascist Poetry
John Milton	Joannes Milton	1608–74	English	Defensio pro Populo Anglicano	Poetry, polemics
Giovanni Pico della Mirandola	Johannes Picus de Mirandula	1463–1494	Italian	Conclusiones philosophicae, cabalisticae et theologicae; De dignitate hominis	Philosophy
Francesco Maria Molza		1489–1544			
Michel de Montaigne		1533–92			
Claude Hervé de Montaigu		1687–1762			
Peter van den Bergh	Petrus Montanus	1467–1507	Dutch	De Poetis; De Medicis; De Principibus; De Vita Beata	Poetry, satire
Robert Moor (Note: See Wikidata entry)		1568–1640			
Olimpia Fulvia Morata		1526–55			
Thomas More		1478–1535		Epigrammata (1518) marks the transition to Neo Latin	Various
Daniel Georg Morhof		1539–1691			
Claude Barthélemy Morisot	Claudius Bartolomaeus Morisotus	1592–1661	French		
Domenico Morosini		1417–1509	Italian	De bene instituta re publica	Government
Peter du Moulin		1601–84	English-French	Regii sanguinis clamor ad coelum adversus paricidas Anglicanos	Politics
Francesco Mucanzio	Franciscus Mucantius	1573–90 fl.			Diarist
Marc-Antoine Muret	Marcus Antonius Muretus	1526–85			
Albertino Mussato		1261–1329			
Johannes Michael Nagonius	Johannes Michael Nagonius	1450–1510			
Naldo Naldi	Naldus Naldius	1432–1513	Italian		
Petrus Nannius		1500–57	Dutch		
Thomas Naogeorg		1508–63			
Giovanni Napoleone	Ioannes Napoleone	c. 1920 – c. 1940	Italian	Carmen lustrale (1928)	Poetry, Fascist Poetry
Neri de' Nerli		1459–1524			
Martin Nessel	Martinus Nesselius	1607–73			
Agostino Nifo		1473–1545			
Marius Nizzolius		1498–1576			
Roberto Nobili		1577–1656			
Heinrich Nolle		1626 d.			
Federigo Nomi		1633–1705			
Christopher Ocland		1590 d.			
François Olivier	Franciscus Olivarius	1497–1560			
Dermod O'Meara		1614–42 fl.			
Johannes Opicius		1492–3 fl.			
Martin Opitz		1597–1639			
Abraham Ortelius		1527–1598	Dutch		Economics
Philip O'Sullivan Beare		1590–1634			
John Owen	Ioannes Owen, Joannes Audoenus	1564–1622			
Marco Antonio Paganutio					
Marcello Palingenio	Marcellus Palingenius Stellatus	1500–51	Italian	Zodiacus Vitae	Zodiac; poetry
Francesco Pandolfini		1470–1520			
Gianantonio de Porcellio Pandoni		1409–1485			Epigrammatist
John Parkhurst		1511/2–1574/5			
Janus Pannonius		1434–1472			Epigrammatist, poetry
Paolo Pansa	Paulus Pansa	1485–1538			
	Petrus Papeus	1539 fl.			
Nicolas de Peiresc	Peirescius	1580–1637			
Nicolas Petit		1497–1532			
Francesco Petrarca	Petrarchus	1304–74			
James Philp		1654/5–1720			
Enea Silvio Bartolomeo Piccolomini	Aeneas Silvius Piccolomini	1458–64	Italian	Historia de duobus amantibus an erotic novel; Commentariorum libri XIII. A Pope.	Novels, autobiography
Willibald Pirckheimer		1470–1530			
	Ioannes Baptista Pius	1475–1542			
Franciscus Plante		1613–90			
Bartolemeo Platina		1421–81		Arrested for pagan tendencies. Later at Vatican library. Historia de viris pontificum Romanorum and De honesta voluptate et valetudine	Food and health
Sicco Polenton		1375–1447			
Melchior de Polignac		1661–1742			
Angelo Poliziano	Angelus Politianus	1454–94		Silvae	
Giovanni Gioviano Pontano		1429–1503		De amore coniugali; Baiae; Neniae; Eridanus speech and morals De sermone; De fortitudine	Light poetry
	Jacobus Pontanus	1542–1626			
Johann Ludwig Prasch	Johannis Ludovicus Praschius	1637–90			
Susanna Prasch		1661–1691			
Ubertino Pusculo	Ubertino Pusculus	1431–88			
	Erycius Puteanus	1574–1646			
George Puttenham		1529–90			
Francis Quarles		1592–1644			
Claude Quillet		1602–61			
Benvenuto Rambaldi	Benvenutus Imolensis, Benvenutus de Rambaldis	1330–88			
René Rapin		1621–87			
Džono Rastic	Junius Restius	1755–1814			
Johann Reuchlin		1455–1522			
Nicolas Reusner		1545–1602			
	Beatus Rhenanus	1485–1547			
Nicolas Rigault	Rigaltius	1577–1654			
Francesco Robortello		1577–1654	Italian	In librum Aristotelis de arte poetica explanationes (1548)	Art of poetry
Francesco Rococciolo		1460–1528			
Pierre Ronsard		1524–85			
Gian Vittorio Rossi		1577–1647			
Adriaen de Roulers	Adrianus Roulerius	1597 d.			
Adrianus van Royen		1704–79			
Jean Roze	Ioannes Roze	1679–1719			
George Ruggle		1575–1622			
David Ruhnkenius		1723–1798	Dutch		
Jan Rutgersius		1589–1625			
	Sabinus; Angelus Gnaeus Quirinus Sabinus	1460–80 fl.			
	Georgius Sabinus,	1508–60			
Coluccio Salutati	Linus Coluccius Salutati	1331–1406		De laboribus Herculis; De nobilitate legum et medicine; De seculo et religione;De fato et fortuna; De tyranno; Lucretia	
János Zsámboky	Johannes Pannonicus Sambucus	1531–84			
	Joannes Sangenesius	1654 fl.			
Iacopo Sannazaro		1458–1530			
Joannes Sapidus		1490–1561			
Maciej Kazimierz Sarbiewski	Matthias Casimirus Sarbievius	1595–1640			
Pierre-Juste Sautel		1613–62			
Joseph Justus Scaliger		1540–1609	French	Opus de emendatione temporum (1583)	Chronology
Julius Caesar Scaliger		1484–1558			
Cornelius Schoen	Schoenaeus	1541–1611			
	Petrus Scholirius	1583–1635			
Jacob Schöpper		1554 d.			
Hermann Schotten		1503–46			
Quintus Sectanus		1660–1726			
Joannes Secundus	Janus Secundus	1511–36			Poetry
Petrus Lotichius Secundus		1528–60			
Ioannes Ginesius Sepulveda		1490–1573			
Anne Seymour		1538–88	English		
Jane Seymour		1541–61	English		
Margaret Seymour		1540	English		
	Cornelius Schonaeus	1540–1611	Dutch		Drama
Adam Siber		1516–84			
Lucius Marineus Siculus		1460–1533			
Luisa Sigea		1522–60			
Carlo Sigonio	Carolus Sigonius	1524–84			
Joanne Soter		1518–43 fl.			
Etienne Auguste Souciet		1671–1744			
Sperone Speroni		1500–88			
Francesco Sperulo		1463–1531			
Richard Stanihurst		1547–1618			
Benedict Stay		1714–1801			
Bernardino Stefonio		1560–1620			
Giulio Cesare Stella		1564–1624			
Caspar Stiblinus		1526–62			
John Stockwood		1610 d.			
Famiano Strada	Famianus	1572–1649			
John Stradling		1563–1637			
Ercole Strozzi		1473–1508	Italian		Poetry
Tito Vespasiano Strozzi		1424–1505	Italian		
Jean Sturm	Ioannes Sturmius	1507–89			
	Johannes Surius	1617–21 fl.			
François Tarillon		1666–1735			
Torquato Tasso		1544–95			
Francesco Tedaldi		1420–1490			
Diogo de Teive		1514–1569			
Emanuele Tesauro		1592–1675			
Jacques Auguste de Thou		1553–1617	French	Historiarum sui temporis … libri (1604)	History
Ambrogio Traversari		1386–1439			
Gaspare Trimbocchi	Tribrachus	1439–1493	Italian		
Gian Giorgio Trissino		1478–1550			
Piero Valeriano		1477–1558	Italian	Hieroglyphica (1556); speculation on their meaning	History
Lorenzo Valla	Laurentius Valla	1407–57		Elegantiae; Repastinatio dialecticae et philosophiae;De falso credita et ementita Constantini donatione	Philosophy, theology, Latin style
William Vaughan		1577–1641			
Maffeo Vegio		1407–58		Astyanax; Vellus aureum; Antonias; De rebus antiquis memorabilibus S. Petri Romae	Epics, history
	Caspar Ursinus Velius	1493–1539			
Miguel Venegas		1531–1589			
	Carolus Verardus	1492 fl.			
	Marcellinus Verardus	1493 fl.			
Pier Vergerio		1370–1444			
Polydore Vergil		1470–1555			
Michele Verino		1469–87			
Ugolino Verino		1438–1516			
	Nicolaus Vernulaeus	1583–1649	Dutch		Drama
	Andreas Vesalius	1514–1564	Dutch		Medicine
Marco Girolamo Vida		1485–1566	Italian	De bombyce (On the Silkworm) and De ludo scaccorum (On the Game of Chess); Christias, a life of Christ	Reference / textbooks
Alexander of Villedieu		1175–1240			
José Antonio de Villerías y Roelas		1695–1728			
Giovanni Antonio Viperano		1535–1610			
	Janus Vitalis	1485–1560			
Juan Luis Vives		1493–1540	Dutch	Exercitatio linguae Latinae	Colloquia
	Gerardus Joannes Vossius	1577–1649			
Bonaventura Vulcanius		1538–1514			
James Ware		1594–1666			
Thomas Watson		1556–92			Ovidian or Petrarchan poetry
Elizabeth Jane Weston	Elisabetha Ioanna Westonia	1582–1612	English		Poetry
Richard Willes	Ricardus Willeius	1546–1579			
Thomas Wilson		1524–81			
Jakob Wimpheling		1450–1528			
Kornelis Wouters	Cornelius Valerius	1512–1578	Dutch		
Daniel Wyttenbach		1746–1820			
Basilio Zanchi		1501–58			
Jakob Zovitius	Jacobus Zovitius	1512–1540			
Matteo Zuppardo	Matthaeus Zuppardus	1400–57			

== Sources ==
- Backus, I. (2014a). "Gassendi, Pierre.". In Ford, Philip; Bloemendal, Jan; Fantazzi, Charles (eds.). Brill's Encyclopaedia of the Neo-Latin World. Vol. I. Brill Reference Online. doi:10.1163/9789004271296_enlo_B9789004271029_0031.
- Considine, John (2014). "Encyclopaedias and Dictionaries". In Ford, Philip; Bloemendal, Jan; Fantazzi, Charles (eds.). Brill's Encyclopaedia of the Neo-Latin World. Vol. I. Brill Reference Online. doi:10.1163/9789004271296_enlo_B9789004271012_0020.
- Deneire, Tom (2014). "Neo-Latin Literature—The Low Countries". In Ford, Philip; Bloemendal, Jan; Fantazzi, Charles (eds.). Brill's Encyclopaedia of the Neo-Latin World. Vol. I. Brill Reference Online. doi:10.1163/9789004271296_enlo_B9789004271029_0082.
- Ferrand, Mathieu (2014). "Neo-Latin Literature—France: The Sixteenth Century: Literature". In Ford, Philip; Bloemendal, Jan; Fantazzi, Charles (eds.). Brill's Encyclopaedia of the Neo-Latin World. Vol. I. Brill Reference Online. doi:10.1163/9789004271296_enlo_B9789004271029_0071.
- Ford, Philip; Bloemendal, Jan; Fantazzi, Charles, eds. (2014). Brill's Encyclopaedia of the Neo-Latin World. Vol. I & II. The Netherlands: Brill.
- IJsewijn, Jozef; Sacré, Dirk (1990–1998). Companion to Neo-Latin Studies. Vol. I & II. Leuven University Press.
- Fantazzi, Charles (2014). "Neo-Latin Literature—Italy: The Cinquecento". In Ford, Philip; Bloemendal, Jan; Fantazzi, Charles (eds.). Brill's Encyclopaedia of the Neo-Latin World. Vol. I. Brill Reference Online. doi:10.1163/9789004271296_enlo_B9789004271029_0080.
- Kallendorf, Craig (2014b). "Neo-Latin Literature—Italy: The Age of Petrarch". In Ford, Philip; Bloemendal, Jan; Fantazzi, Charles (eds.). Brill's Encyclopaedia of the Neo-Latin World. Vol. I. Brill Reference Online. doi:10.1163/9789004271296_enlo_B9789004271029_0078.
- Kallendorf, Craig (2014). "Neo-Latin Literature—Italy: The Quattrocento". In Ford, Philip; Bloemendal, Jan; Fantazzi, Charles (eds.). Brill's Encyclopaedia of the Neo-Latin World. Vol. I. Brill Reference Online. doi:10.1163/9789004271296_enlo_B9789004271029_0079.
- Lamers, Han; Reitz-Joosse, Bettina L; Sacré, Dirk (2014). "Neo-Latin Literature—Italy: Fascism (1922–1943)". In Ford, Philip; Bloemendal, Jan; Fantazzi, Charles (eds.). Brill's Encyclopaedia of the Neo-Latin World. Vol. I. Brill Reference Online. doi:10.1163/9789004271296_enlo_B9789004271029_0081.
- Moul, Victoria, ed. (2017). A Guide to Neo-Latin Literature. Cambridge, United Kingdom: Cambridge University Press. ISBN 9781108820066. OL 29875053M.
- Porter, David A. (2014). "Neo-Latin Literature—The British Isles: The Long Sixteenth Century". In Ford, Philip; Bloemendal, Jan; Fantazzi, Charles (eds.). Brill's Encyclopaedia of the Neo-Latin World. Vol. I. Brill Reference Online. doi:10.1163/9789004271296_enlo_B9789004271029_0069.
- Knight, Sarah; Tilg, Stefan, eds. (2015). The Oxford Handbook of Neo-Latin. New York: Oxford University Press. ISBN 9780190886998. OL 28648475M.
- Rees, Valery (2014). "Neo-Latin Literature—Hungary: The Fifteenth and Sixteenth Centuries". In Ford, Philip; Bloemendal, Jan; Fantazzi, Charles (eds.). Brill's Encyclopaedia of the Neo-Latin World. Vol. I. Brill Reference Online. doi:10.1163/9789004271296_enlo_B9789004271029_0076.
