= Decembrio =

Decembrio was the family name of a group of Italian Renaissance humanists.

- Anselmo
  - Uberto (died 1427), son of Anselmo, was a secretary to the Milanese duke Giangaleazzo Visconti (died 1402) and to Peter of Candia (later antipope with the name Alexander V). He had contact with Manuel Chrysoloras during his stay in Milan (1400-1403) and engaged in the translation of Greek texts.
    - Modesto (died 1430), son of Uberto
    - Pier Candido (died 1477), son of Uberto, secretary and diplomat for the Milanese duke Filippo Maria Visconti (1392–1447), was called a "president" of the short-living Ambrosian republic in Milan (1447–1450). He was exiled after 1450 and spent some time in Naples at the court of Alfonso V and in Ferrara. His tombstone notes 127 works, among them translations and biographies.
    - Paolo Valerio (died 1424), son of Uberto
    - Angelo Camillo (died after 1465), son of Uberto, spent some time in Milan and Ferrara, before heading to Naples (1450) and thence to Spain (after 1458). His major work is De politia litteraria.
