= Barbara Torelli =

Italian noblewoman and possibly poet (c.1475 – after 1533)

Barbara Torelli (c. 1475 – after 1533) was an Italian noblewoman known for her entanglement in the murder of her second husband, Ercole Strozzi. She is supposed to have written a sonnet about his death, which has been much anthologised but also suspected of being a forgery.

== Life ==
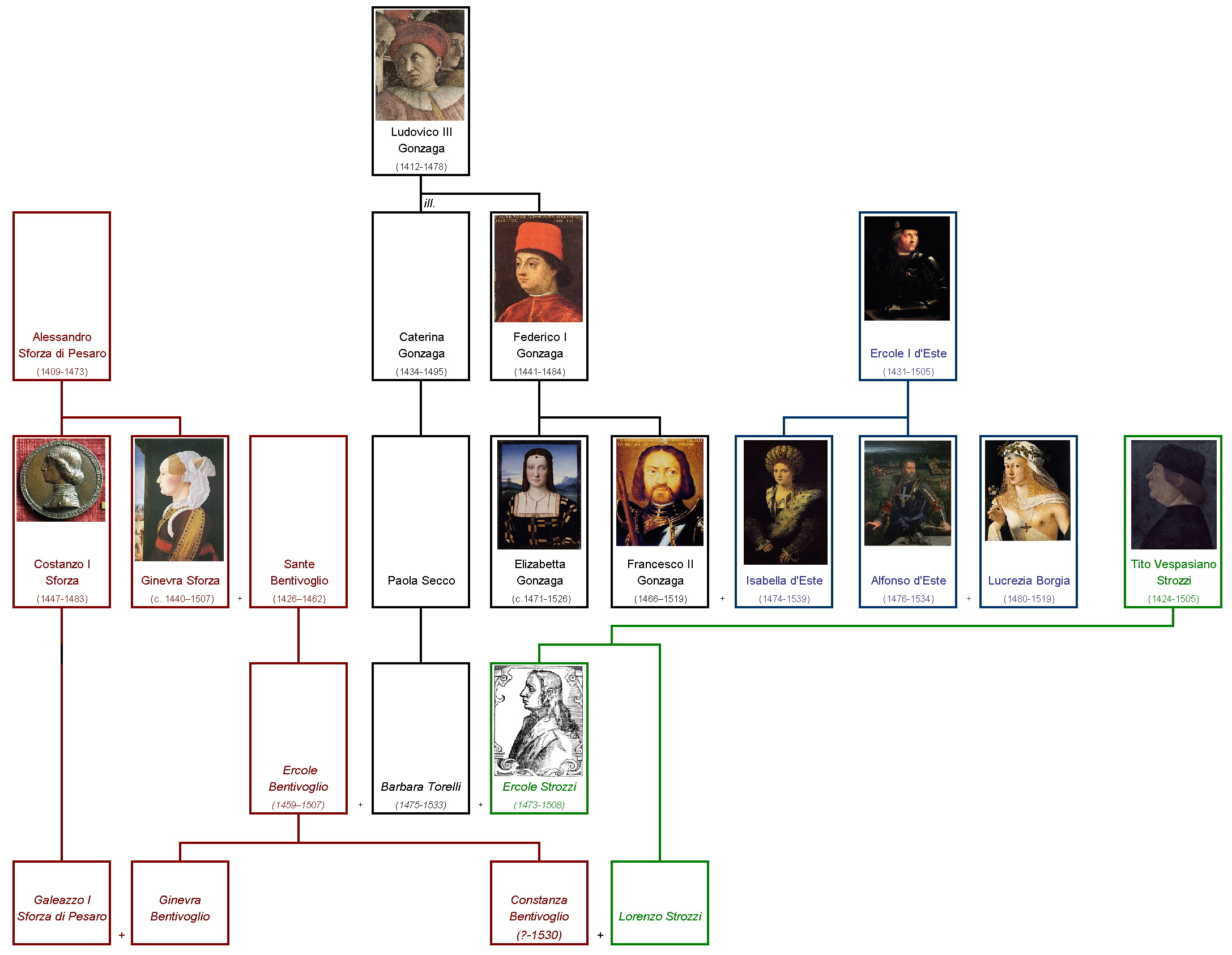
Family tree of Barbara Torelli, showing her connection to Francesco Gonzaga, her cousin once removed.

Barbara was born about 1475 to Marsilio II, fourth count of Montechiarugolo.

In 1491, she married the warlord Ercole Bentivoglio. By 1503, she had separated from him and was having a relationship with the poet Ercole Strozzi. Her first child with Strozzi, Cesare, was born in 1506. They married in September 1507, after Bentivoglio's death, and had a daughter, Giulia, in 1508.

In the morning of 6 June 1508, Strozzi was found dead in the streets near his house with twenty-two stab wounds. It was speculated that the murder was connected with Strozzi’s friend Lucrezia Borgia: either that Lucrezia was jealous of Strozzi’s new wife, or that her husband, Alfonso d'Este, was in love with Barbara. Another suspect was Giangaleazzo Sforza, Ercole Bentivoglio’s brother-in-law who was trying to get Barbara’s dowry back from her first marriage to Bentivoglio. Two days after the murder, Barbara and her two brothers-in-law went to Mantua to ask for Francesco Gonzaga’s help avenging it, but he did not intervene.

Several poets, including Aldo Manuzio and Pietro Bembo, wrote obituary verses for Strozzi which emphasised Barbara’s loyalty to him. Barbara is also supposed to have written a sonnet which was performed at his funeral. However, it has been suggested that the sonnet was a forgery by the seventeenth-century anthologist Girolamo Baruffaldi.

Barbara asked Francesco Gonzaga to be godfather to her daughter Giulia, who would go on to be engaged to Alberto Gazolo in 1518. In a letter to Francesco, Barbara accused Bentivoglio's family of both taking her husband from her and trying to take her dowry. The Strozzi brothers also contested her inheritance from her second husband.

In 1525, Barbara married for a third time, to Lazzaro Doria. They travelled from Pisa to Lucca for the wedding in order to avoid paying tax on the dowry.

She spent her last years between Parma and Bologna. She was still alive in 1533, when she dictated her will in Bologna.

== In popular culture ==
Barbara Torelli was portrayed by Pina de Angelis in the 1940 Italian film Lucrezia Borgia.
