= Dirk Sacré =

Dirk Sacré is a professor of Latin at KU Leuven. He was general editor of Supplementa Humanistica Lovaniensia, and is co-editor of Officina Neolatina and Pluteus Neolatinus. He is also on several editorial boards including of Vox Latina. He is an advisor to the Ludwig Boltzmann Institute for Neo-Latin Studies and was Vice-President of the Academia Latinitati Fovendae, an institute that promotes the use of Latin. He also authored the second part of the standard volume on Neo-Latin, the Companion to Neo-Latin studies, published in 1998.

In 2021, Sacré received a "Festschrift" Dulces ante omnia Musae in honour of his work in the field of Neo-Latin studies, especially regarding poetry.

Sacré also writes in Latin.

== Publications ==
- 1984: "Pagina philologorum: de carmine F. Sràmek e Bohemo verso a Ioanne Sprincl, Brunnae, die 16. III. 1984", in Melissa, n° 2, anno 1984, p. 6.
- 1984: « Pagina philologorum : carmen Iosephi Tusiani ad Verlaine poetam », Melissa, 3, 1984, p. 3.
- 1985: "De Iani Novak carminibus latinis in memoriam suavissimi poetae", in Melissa, n° 5, anno 1985, pp. 5–7.
- 1985: "De Hugone Henrico Paoli lucubratiuncula", in Melissa, n° 6, anno 1985, p. 4.
- 1985: "Iosephi Venturini carmen", in Melissa, n° 7, anno 1985, pp. 6–7.
- 1985: "De epistula quadam obscuri viri ad Ortuinum Gratium", in Melissa, n° 8, anno 1985, p. 10.
- 1986: "Melissa Litteraria. De Aoni Paleari poemato ad M. Antonium Maphaeum", in Melissa, n° 10, anno 1986, p. 8, p. 11, p. 12.
- 1986: "De Aoni Paleari poematio ad M. Ant. Maphaeum", in Melissa, n° 11, anno 1986, p. 5.
- 1986: "De Calevalaide e Fennico in latinum nuperrime conversa", in Melissa, n° 12, anno 1986, pp. 10–11.
- 1986: "De Aenea Silvio comoedographo", in Melissa, n° 13, anno 1986, p. 7.
- 1986: "De Michaelangelo Petruzziello optimo latinitatis scriptore", in Melissa, n° 14, anno 1986, pp. 10–11.
- 1986: "De colloquio Secundiano exeunte mense septembri in urbe Mechlinia facto", in Melissa, n° 15, anno 1986, pp. 10–11.
- 1988: "De Professoris Ijsewijn lexicographis", in Melissa, n° 23, anno 1988. p. 11.
- 1988: "De Arturo Rimbaldio versificatore Latino", in Melissa, n° 24, anno 1988, pp. 10–13.
- 1988: "Laurenti Viscido poematia Latina", in Melissa, n° 25, anno 1988, p. 8.
- 1988: "De latinitate recentiore quid senserit Patrus Angelinius", in Melissa, n° 27, anno 1988, pp. 2–3.
- 1989: "De Latinitate recentiore quid senserit Petrus Angelinius", in Melissa, n° 28, anno 1989, pp. 5–6.
- 1989: "Ab oblivione vindicetur... Ferdinandus Verbiest", in Melissa, n° 28, anno 1989, pp. 8–9 et p. 12.
- 1989: "Ab oblivione vindicetur... Rudolphus van Oppenraay... poeta idemque praeco patris Damiani De Veuster", in Melissa, n° 29, anno 1989, pp. 8–9 et p. 15.
- 1989: "Ab oblivione vindicetur... Thomas Elsaesser O.S.B. colloquiorum scriptor", in Melissa, n° 30, anno 1989, pp. 8–9, p. 15.
- 1989: "De Iacobo Vanierio poeta Latino", in Melissa, N) 30, anno 1989, pp. 14–15 (Scripsit una cum Marco Decreton).
- 1989: "De titulis nonnullis Mediolanensibus nondum editis", in Melissa, n° 31, anno 1989, pp. 6–7, p. 9.
- 1989: "Ab oblivione vindicentur... quattuor versiones latinae eiusdem carminis", in Melissa, n° 31, anno 1989, pp. 8–9.
- 1989: "De Aeneide emendata (?) (Arituneus Mizuno, Aeneidos liber primus emendatus", Kioti, 1988)", in Melissa, n° 32, anno 1989, p. 7.
- 1989: "Ab oblivione vindicetur... in Francogallos ab Austriacis e Belgio expulsos carmen anno 1793 scriptum", in Melissa, n° 32, anno 1989, pp. 8–9.
- 1989: "Ab oblivione vindicetur... Petri Nigelli iter (Rudolphi Van Oppenraaij carmen ineditum) ", in Melissa, n° 33, anno 1989, pp. 8–9.
- 1989: "In memoriam Jani Sprincl", in Melissa, n° 33, anno 1989, p. 9.
- 1990: "Antrum hoc horrendum caelestis devoret ignis. Een poëtische celbrief in het Latijn, anno 1828", in: Handelingen, XLIV, Koninklijke Zuidnederlandse Maatschappij voor Taal- en Letterkunde en Geschiedenis, 1990, pp. 63–88.
- 1990: "Ab oblivione vindicetur... Californiados carmen", in Melissa, n° 34, anno 1990, pp. 8–9.
- 1990: "De Thoma Elsaesser adnotatiuncula", in Melissa, n° 34, anno 1990, p. 16.
- 1990: "Ab oblivione vindicentur... Iosephi Favaro (1877-1954) parerga", in Melissa, n° 35, pp. 8–9.
- 1990: "Ab oblivione vindicentur... Bernardinus Ramazzini medicus et scriptor latinus", in Melissa, n° 36, anno 1990, pp. 8–9.
- 1990: "Ab oblivione vindicetur... Ferdinandus Borsetti Ferrariensis Poggii Florentini heres", in Melissa, n° 37, anno 1990, pp. 8–10.
- 1990: "Ab oblivione vindicentur... opuscula scholastica saec. XIX (inedita)", in Melissa, n° 38, anno 1990, pp. 8–9.
- 1990: "De novis libris. 'Hergé, De Titini et Miluli facinoribus: De sigaris Pharaonis. In latinum convertit Caelestis Eichenseer auxiliantibus Gaio Licoppe et Francisca Deraedt Bruxellensibus et Sigride Albert Saravipontana (Casterman/ELI)", (recensio), in Melissa, n° 39, anno 1990, p. 3.
- 1990: "Ab oblivione vindicetur... Musa musices (pars prima)", in Melissa, n° 39, anno 1990, pp. 8–9.
- 1991: "Carmina Galliambica". (Cecinit Arituneus Mizuno, enarravit Theodoricus Sacré), in Melissa, n° 40, anno 1991, p. 7.
- 1991: "Musa Musices (pars altera)", in Melissa, n° 40, anno 1991, pp. 8–9.
- 1991: "Musa Musices (pars quarta)", in Melissa, n° 43, anno 1991, pp. 8–9.
- 1991: "Musa Musices (Pars quinta)", N) 44, anno 1991, pp. 8–9.
- 1991: "Musa Musices (Pars sexta)", in Melissa, n° 45, anno 1991, pp. 8–9.
- 1991: De poesi Latina parte saeculi XVI posteriore Mediolani exculta prolusio. Accedit Ioannis Baptistae Vicecomitis de Iesu Christo poema nunc primum editum, Romae, ACADEMIA Latinitati Fovendae, Bibliotheca Scriptorum Latinorum, 1991, 93 pp. (Piazza dei Cavalieri di Malta, 2 - 00153 Roma)
- 1992: "Christumferens Columbus (Carmen Aemili Gouffauxà", in Melissa, n° 46, anno 1992, pp. 8–9.
- 1992: "De novis libris. 'Metamorphoses. carmina poetarum recentiorum in Latinum vertit Paul(us) Claes (NL), 1991' " (recensio), in Melissa, n) 46, anno 1992.
- 1992: "Ab oblivione vindicentur... Iosephi Mariani Parthenii sive Mazzolari (1712-1786) epistulae", in Melissa, n° 47, anno 1992, pp. 8–9.
- 1992: "Ab oblivione vindicentur... Iosephi Mariani Perthenii sive Mazzolari (1712-1786) epistulae (II)", in Melissa, n° 48, anno 1992, pp. 8–10.
- 1992: "Iosephi Mariani Parthenii sive Mazzolari (1712-1786) epistulae (III)", in Melissa, n° 49, anno 1992, pp. 8–9.
- 1992: "Ab oblivione vindicetur... Franciscus Bernardinus Bovius poeta Ferrariensis (saec. XVI)", in Melissa, n° 50, anno 1992, pp. 8–9.
- 1992: "Ab oblivione vindicetur... Vitalis Benedictus Mazoyer (1799-1856). Hymni Massiliensis Latinus interpres", in Melissa, anno 1992, pp. 8–9.
- 1992: Aonii Palearii Verulani 'De animorum immortalitate libri III'. Introduction and Text., Bruxellis, Koninklijke Academie voor Wetenschappen, Letteren en Schone Kunsten van België, 1992.
- 1993: ""Ab oblivione vindicetur...Maria Andreas de Chaligny de Plaine (1717-1805) poeta Latinus (I)", in Melissa, n° 52, anno 1993, pp. 8–9.
- 1993: "Ab oblivione vindicetur... Maria Andreas de Chaligny de Plaine (1717-1805) poeta Latinus (II), in Melissa, n° 53, anno 1993, pp. 8-10.
- 1993: "Eugenius Cauchy poeta Latinus", in Melissa, n° 54, anno 1993, pp. 8–9 et p. 14 (adnotatio).
- 1993: "A contemptu vindicetur... Iohannis Baptistae Vici (1688-1744). Epistularum commercium Latinarum", in Melissa, n° 55, pp. 8–10.
- 1993: "Ab oblivione vindicentur... Guilielmi Cowper (1731-1800) versiculi Latini", in Melissa, n° 56, anno 1993, pp. 8–9.
- 1993: "Ab oblivione vindicetur... Lamberti Vossii Belgae (1602 (?)-1648 (?) ) Ode ad Fridericum Borromaeum inedita", in Melissa, n° 57, anno 1993, pp. 8–9.
- 1994: "Ab oblivione vindicentur... Melchioros Barlaei Antverpiensis (ca. 1540-1584) epistolae et carmina", in Melissa, n° 58, anno 1994, pp. 8–9.
- 1994: "Ab oblivione vindicentur... Melchioris Barlaei humanistae Antverpiensis inedita opuscula et edita", in Melissa, n° 59, anno 1994, pp. 8–10.
- 1994: "Florianus Caldani cur linguam Latinam in re anatomica retinendam censuerit", in Melissa, n° 60, anno 1994, pp. 6–7.
- 1994: "Ab oblivione vindicetur... Anthologia ex 'Alaudis' ", in Melissa, n° 63, anno 1994, pp. 8–11.
- 1994: "Postridie Cal. Nov. " (carmen strophis sapphicis), in Melissa, n° 63, anno 1994, p. 11.
- 1995: "Ab oblivione vindicetur... Anthologia e 'Latine' (1882-1886)", in Melissa, n° 64, anno 1995, pp. 8–12.
- 1995: "Ab oblivione vindicetur... 'Janus, Universae Latinitatis recensio et libellus bimestris' (1919-1924)", in Melissa, n° 65, anno 1995, pp. 8–10.
- 1995: "Ab oblivione vindicetur... Anthologia e 'Iuventute' (1910-1944), in Melissa, n° 66, anno 1995, pp. 8-11.
- 1995: "Pentameter Lusus" (carmen), in Melissa, n° 66, anno 1995, p. 11.
- 1995: "Ab oblivione vindicentur... Balthasaris et Melchioris Moretorum, Plantini nepotum, epistolae et carmina inedita (saec. XVI) (I)", in Melissa, n° 68, anno 1995, pp. 10–12.
- 1995: "Ab oblivione vindicentur... Balthasaris et Melchioris Moretorum, Plantini nepotum, epistolae et carmina inedita (saec. XVI) (II) ", in Melissa, n° 69, anno 1995, pp. 8–10.
- 1996: "Ab oblivione vindicentur... Balthasaris et Melchioris Moretorum, Plantini nepotum, epistolae et carmina inedita (saec. XVI) (III)", in Melissa, n° 70, anno 1996, pp. 8–10.
- 1996: "Inedita emblemata Bruxellis olim affixa (saec. XVII)", in Melissa, n° 71, anno 1996, pp. 8–9.
- 1996: "In piam memoriam Ioh. Alexandri Gaertner poetae Latini (1912-1996)", in Melissa, n° 72, pp. 5–6.
- 1996: "Sidronius Hoschius poeta Latinus (1596-1653) (I)", in Melissa, n° 72, anno 1996, pp. 9–11..
- 1996: "Ab oblivione vindicetur... Sidronius Hossschius (1596-1653) [II. Artis Hosschianae specimina] selecta a Theodorico Sacré", in Melissa, n° 73, anno 1996, pp. 8–9.
- 1996: "Ab oblivione vindicetur... Sidronius Hosschius poeta Latinus (1596-1653) [III. Artsis Hosschianae specimina] selecta a Theodorico Sacré", in Melissa, n° 74, anno 1996, pp. 7–8.
- 1996: "Haicua Belgo-Latina", in Melissa, n° 75, anno 1996, pp. 8–9.
- 1997: "Oedipus Rex Stravinscianus (1927)", in Melissa, n° 76, pp. 8–11.
- 1997: "Mortis Lipsianae relatio inedita", in Melissa, n° 77, anno 1997, pp. 6–8.
- 1997: "Mortis Lipsianae relatio critice edita", in Melissa, n° 78, anno 1997, pp. 7–9.
- 1997: "Inscriptiones sepulcrales saec. XIX quae Romae leguntur in S. Mariae de Populo", in Melissa, n° 80, anno 1997, pp. 8–11.
- 1997: "Balduinus Cabillavius (15821652) e S.I. poeta Latinus", in Melissa, n° 81, anno 1997, p. 6-9.
- 1998: "Diplomata Bruxellensibus doctoribus H.C. donata", in Melissa, n° 82, anno 1998, pp. 7–9.
- 1998: "Balduinus Cabillavius (1568-1652) e S.I. poeta Latinus (II)", in Melissa, n° 83, anno 1998, pp. 9–11.
- 1998: "Balduinus Cabillavius (1568-1652) e S.I. poeta Latinus (III)", in Melissa, n° 84, anno 1998, pp. 8–10.
- 1998: "Carmina Henrici Basilii Wijngaert (alias De Wijngaerde O.S.A. (1596(?) - 1664) [I], (inter quae 'Epigramma in fontem Mannekepis': "Limpida Neptunus saturat tua viscera lymphis:/si te fruge Ceres pasceret, anne caces?), in Melissa, n° 86, anno 1998, pp. 7-9.
- 1998: "Carmina Henrici Basilii Wijngaert (alias De Wijngaerde) O.S.A. (1596(?) - 1664) [II], in Melissa, n° 87, anno 1998, pp. 10-12.
- 1999: "Epigrammata scholastica Henrici Basilii Wijngaert OSA. (1596(?) - 1664) inedita", in Melissa, n° 1999, pp. 9–11.
- 1999: "Iohannis De Coninck (1625-1709) epistola inedita (a. 1646)", in Melissa, n° 91, pp. 7–8.
- 1999: "De Iohanne Berchmanno (1599-1621) poematia duo lusa ab Aemilio Gouffaux (1840-1924) primum edita", in Melissa, n° 93, anno 1999, pp. 9–11.
- 1999: Tonight they all dance. 92 latin and english haiku, edited by D. Sacré and Marcellus Smets, english translations by H. Servotte, illustrations by M. McIntyre, Wauconda, Bolchazy-Carducci Publishers, 1999.
- 1999: "De incepto Siciliensi. Epistula ad Gaium Licoppe", in Melissa, n° 94, anno 2000, pp. 3–4.
- 2000: "Exempla Latinitatis huius aevi academicae", in Melissa, n° 94, anno 2000, pp. 6–8.
- 2000: "Isaaci van der Mije (1602-1656), poetae et pictoris e S.I., epistulae duae primum editae", in Melissa, n° 96, anno 2000, pp. 8–10.
- 2000: "Elegiae et epigrammata Iuliani Waudraei [I]", in Melissa, n° 97, anno 2000, pp. 8–10.
- 2000: "Elegiae et epigrammata Iuliani Waudraei [II]", in Melissa, n° 98, anno 2000, pp. 6–7.
- 2001: "Ab oblivione vindicentur... De Desiderii Erasmi colloquiis", in Melissa, n° 1000, anno 2001, pp. 2–11.
- 2001: "Responsum ad carmen Annae Elysiae Radke cui titulus "Ad merulam quandam Bruxellensem", a Theodorico Sacré datum d. 19 m. Febr. 2001" (epigramma), in Melissa, n° 101, anno 2001, p. 15.
- 2001: "Inedita poematia C. Arrii Nuri (1907-1979)", in Melissa, n° 103, anno 2001, pp. 4–5.
- 2001: Musa superstes. De poesi saeculi XX Latina schediasmata, Romae in aedibus Academiae Belgicae, 2001, 62 pp.
- 2001: "Carmina nunc quoque Romanis resonantia chordis". Flores Latini ex horto poesis hodierbnae selecti, quos collegit praefatiunculisque instructos edidit Th. Sacré, Cortoriaci, Letteren Kulak, 2001, 126 pp.
- 2001: "Ab oblivione vindicentur... Iosephi Morabito (1900-1997) epigrammata inedita", in Melissa, n° 104, anno 2001, pp. 6–7.
- 2001: "Ab oblivione vindicetur... Iosephus Eberle diurnarius natione Suebus idemque poeta latinus ante hos centum natus annos (1991-1986)", in Melissa, n° 105, anno 2001, pp. 6–8.
- 2002: "Ab oblivione vindicentur... Tituli Romani (saec. XVIII-XX)", in Melissa, n° 106, anno 2002, p. 7-9.
- 2002: " 'Calepini Novi' praefatio", in Melissa, n° 109, anno 2002, pp. 2–4.
- 2003: "Inedita Hieronymi Bononii (1454-1517) epigrammata familiaria", in Melissa, n° 112, anno 2003, pp. 6–9.
- 2003: "Inedita Hieronymi Bononii (1454-1517) epigrammata familiaria (II)", in Melissa, n° 113, anno 2003, pp. 7–9.
- 2003: "Inedita Hieronymi Bononii (1454-1517) epigrammata litteraria, iocosa, lasciva", in Melissa, n° 114, anno 2003, pp. 8–9.
- 2003: "Recentissima latinitatis academicae specimina", in Melissa, n° 116, anno 2003, pp. 8–9.
- 2004: "Documenta quaedam academica Latino sermone nuperrime exarata", in Melissa, n° 118, anno 2004, pp. 10–11.
- 2004: "Documenta quaedam academica Latini sermone nuperrime exarata", in Melissa, n° 120, anno 2004, pp. 8–9.
- 2004: "Ignota atque inedita epistula ad Gasparem Barlaeum (1584-1648) poetam scripta", in Melissa, n° 122, anno 2004, pp. 11–13.
- 2005: "Commendatio Gai Licoppe [scripta in Urbe, mense Nov. a. 2004]", in Melissa, n° 124, anno 2005, p. 3.
- 2005: "O Teubneriana Latinitas!", in Melissa, n° 124, anno 2005, pp. 6–8.
- 2005: "In perpetuam memoriam Albini P. Dobsevage (1922-2005)", in Melissa, n° 125, anno 2005, p. 16.
- 2005: " 'Fraterno affectu' sive de II epistulis ad I. C. Gevartium humanistam ineditis (1653-1654)", in Melissa, n° 126, anno 2005, pp. 8–9.
- 2005: "Francisci Molloy (ca. 1606-ca. 1677) poetae ex Hibernis oriundi, epigrammata inedita", in Melissa, n° 128, anno 2005, pp. 9–11.
- 2006: "Ab oblivione vindicentur... Poematia Gasparis Murtolae (ca. 1570-1624) Iohannem Iovianum Pontanum qui est imitatus (I)", in Melissa, n° 130, anno 2006, pp. 8–9.
- 2006: "Poematia Gasparis Murtolae (ca. 1570-1624) Iohannem Iovianum Pontanum qui est imitatus (II)", in Melissa, n° 131, anno 2006, pp. 9–10.
- 2006: "Caroli de Comitibus, poetae Romani, qui Catullum saeculo XVII est imitatus, carmina edita atque inedita (I)", in Melissa, n° 132, anno 2006, pp. 10–12.
- 2006: "Caroli de Comitibus, poetae Romani, qui Catullum saeculo XVII est imitatus, carmina edita atque inedita (II)", in Melissa, n° 133, anno 2006, pp. 11–13.
- 2006: Justus Lipsius (1547-1606), een geleerde en zijn Europese netwerk, Catalogus van de tentoonstelling in de Centrale Bibliotheeek te Leuven 18 okt. - 20 dec. 2006, Supplementa Humanistica Lovaniensia XXI, Leuven University Press, 2006, 626 pp. (scripsit una cum J. De Landtsheer et C. Coppens)
- 2006: Musae Saeculi XX Latinae, Institut historique belge de Rome - Belgisch historisch Instituut te Rome, 2006, 374 pp. (una cum J. Tusiani et T. Deneire).
- 2007: "Ab oblivione vindicentur: Documenta quaedam academica anni 2007", in Melissa, n° 137, anno 2007, pp. 9–11.
- 2008: "De Maphaei Barberini sive Urbani VIII carminibus iuvenilibus (I)", in Melissa, n° 146, anno 2008, pp. 3–7.
- 2008: "De Maphaei Berberini sive Urbani VIII carminibus iuvenilibus (II)", in Melissa, n° 147, anno 2008, pp. 7–10.
- 2009: "De sicario Gandavensi epistula Ludovici de Camargo e S.I. inedita (1664)", in Melissa, n° 149, anno 2009, pp. 1–4.
- 2009: "De nonnullis aevi recentissimi titulis qui apud Italos leguntur", in Melissa, n° 150, anno 2009, pp. 8–10.
- 2009: ediderunt Dirk Sacré et J. Papy, Syntagmatia. Essays on neo-Latin literature in honour of Monique Mund-Dopchie and Gilbert Tournoy, Lovanii, Leuven University Press, 2009, 845 pp.
- 2011: "De Mario Vargas Llosa litterarum auctore praemium Nobelianum adepto", in Melissa, n° 162, Bruxellis, 2011, p. 4.
- 2011: " 'Infremuere ollae gemitumque dedere patellae' : de catto supplicio affecto carmen iocosum (1826) ", (continuabitur), in Melissa, n° 162, Bruxellis, 2011, pp. 7–10.
- 2011: " 'Infremuere ollae gemitumque dedere patellae' : de catto supplicio affecto carmen iocosum (1826) (II)" et "Appendices: Epitaphium viri morsiuncula felis occisi", in Melissa, n° 163, Bruxellis, 2011, pp. 4–8.
- 2011 : " 'De fele ocreata' sive de Caroli Perrault apologo latine quem vertit Franciscus Andrieux (1759-1833)", cum appendice: "Iani Nicii Erythraei apologus de musculo, fele et gallo" in Melissa, n° 164, Bruxellis,2011, pp. 4–9.
- 2011 : "Recens diploma honoris causa Lovaniense" (quo honoratur Rutgerus David Griffin, historiae doctor, professor Oxoniensis), in Melissa, n° 165, Bruxellis, 2011, p. 11.
- 2012 : "Albertus Chiari philologus idemque in adulescentia poeta latinus", in Melissa, n° 166, Bruxellis, 2012, pp. 3–5.
- 2012 : "Qua tabe interierit Franciscus Dralantius doctor Lovaniensis (a. 1610)", in Melissa, n° 167, Bruxellis, 2012, pp. 9–11.
- 2012; "De tribus poematiis, quae sub Torquati Taxi nomine feruntur, spuriis", in Melissa, n° 170, Bruxellis, 2012, pp. 13–16.
- 2013 : Dirk Sacré et Toon van Houdt, Nec scire nefas. Nieuwe bijdragen over Neolatijn voor het onderwijs, Florivallis : Amersfoort, 2013.
- 2014 : "An heir to Joseph Addison : Théodule Paillard-Fernel, in : Camenae, 16, Paris-Sorbonne, 2014.

== Sources ==
- Ludwig Boltzmann Institute for Neo-Latin Studies (2021). "Festschrift for Dirk Sacré". Ludwig Boltzmann Institute for Neo-Latin Studies.
- Ford, Philip; Bloemendal, Jan; Fantazzi, Charles, eds. (2014). Brill's Encyclopaedia of the Neo-Latin World. Vol. I & II. The Netherlands: Brill.
- IJsewijn, Jozef; Sacré, Dirk (1990–1998). Companion to Neo-Latin Studies. Vol. I & II. Leuven University Press.
- Moul, Victoria, ed. (2017). A Guide to Neo-Latin Literature. Cambridge, United Kingdom: Cambridge University Press. ISBN 9781108820066. OL 29875053M.
- Knight, Sarah; Tilg, Stefan, eds. (2015). The Oxford Handbook of Neo-Latin. New York: Oxford University Press. ISBN 9780190886998. OL 28648475M.
