= Pietro Candido =

Pietro Candido (Latin: Petrus Candidus) may refer to:

- Pietro Candido Decembrio (1399–1477), Italian humanist
- Peter Candid (d. 1628), Flemish painter
