= Alessandro Braccesi =

Italian humanist

Alessandro Braccesi (10 December 1445 – 7 July 1503) was an Italian humanist, writer and diplomat. He was born in Florence and died in Rome. Perugino's Portrait of a Boy was long identified as him, but this identification has now been refuted.

== Life ==
He was the eldest of four children born to Sandra and Rinaldo Braccesi. He had to start work at an early age, since his family had fallen into poverty, with his "father and mother old and infirm and providing the dowries for two sisters from the sweat of his own brow and without an inheritance or a father's wealth". He became a notary in 1467 and was employed by the chancellery of the Florentine Republic and Lordship, for whom he worked as a diplomat - between 1470 and 1471 he was in Naples and Rome with the Florentine ambassadors Jacopo Guicciardini and Pierfrancesco de' Medici and then in Bologna and Ferrara.

At the same time he became a humanist scholar and poet - around 1473 he gathered a collection of Italian-language poems dedicated to the lord of Montefeltro Giovanni di Carpegna. He wrote a canzoniere or song-book of love poems in imitation of Petrarch, followed by 200 humorous and mocking sonnets in the style of Burchiello and four carnival songs. About fifteen years later Braccesi added around nineteen elegies and thirty-five sonnets to the canzoniere.

In 1477 he collected all his Latin poems into a three-volume manuscript. The first volume entitled Amorum libellus was dedicated to Francesco Sassetti and consisted of 29 elegies narrating his love for a woman known pseudonymously as Flora, in imitation of Cristoforo Landino's 'Xandra'. The second book, Secundus libellus elegiarum ad amicos, contained twelve poems about everyday life, each dedicated to a different public figure in Florentine life. The third book, Epigrammatum libellus, was a set of epigrams dedicated to Lorenzo de' Medici. Ten years later he partially re-edited and expanded the three books, raising their contents to 31, 24 and 73 poems respectively. This new edition was given an overall dedication to the young Guidobaldo da Montefeltro, but was only printed for the first time in 1954.

During these years Braccesi all worked on a reworking into Italian of Enea Silvio Piccolomini's 1444 Historia de duobus amantibus, which he knew via a Roman edition of 1476. In the original the love affair between the German knight Eurialo and the beautiful Siennese noblewoman Lucrezia had a tragic ending, but Braccesi changed this to a happy ending and added comic and poetic episodes. He justified the changes in his dedication of the new work to Lorenzo di Pierfrancesco de' Medici, stating that he wanted to make reading it enjoyable, especially in times that were "boring and grave for more respectable people, especially due to the change and fear caused by the plague". Published in Milan in the early 1480s by Pachel and Schinzenzeler, it was so successful that it went through several editions right up to the end of the 16th century.

Braccesi worked on another translation into Italian between 1488 and 1491, this time of part of Appian of Alexandria's Histories, namely books VII-IX and XII (known as The Foreign Wars by the Romans) and books XIII-XVII (known as The Civil Wars). He knew little Greek and so based his work on the Latin translation by Pier Candido Decembrio. He dedicated The Foreign Wars to Giampaolo Orsini and The Civil Wars to Gentile Virginio Orsini, with the former published in 1502 and the latter in 1519.

He was also rising through the ranks in his public career - in 1479 he was made second chancellor, in 1480 chancellor to the Dieci di Balia, and then notary and secretary to the Otto di Pratica. From 1483 to 1487 he was one of the six secretaries of the Florentine Republic, whilst in 1488 he and Francesco Gaddi were joint chancellors of the Otto di Pratica. From September 1491 to November 1494 he was Florence's ambassador to Siena, traditionally an enemy of Florence but then being governed by a pro-Medici faction. When the Medici fell he was suddenly recalled to Florence and dismissed as secretary, though he was reappointed by the end of the year and returned to his diplomatic role.

His most important diplomatic mission was to Rome in 1497, assisting ambassador Ricciardo Becchi at the Borgia court, which was pressing Florence to suppress Savonarola (whom Braccesi admired) and annul its alliance with France in exchange for the territory of Pisa. Whilst the mission was in Rome the pope excommunicated Savonarola, but Braccesi defended Florence's policy, secretly informed Savonarola about the negotiations and carried out secret negotiations with a cardinal on the possibility of calling a council to depose the Borgias and reform the Church as Savonarola hoped to do. The anti-Savonarola uprising in Florence in 1498 led to his condemnation and Braccesi's fall from grace. He was dismissed from all his positions and after a few years in isolation gained the trust of the new rulers of Florence. At the end of 1502 he was sent back to Rome, where he fell ill and died. He is buried in Santa Prassede beneath an epitaph composed by his nephew Agnolo Firenzuola.

== Works ==
- Canzoniere e sonetti, c.1473, largely unedited
- Quattro canti carnascialeschi, c.1473
- Amorum libellus, Liber secundus epistolarum ad amicos, Epigrammatum libellus, c.1477-1487.
- Historia de duobus amantibus di Enea Silvio Piccolomini, translation, c.1479.
- Guerre esterne de' romani di Appiano Alessandrino, translation, c.1488.
- Guerre civili de' romani di Appiano Alessandrino, translation, 1491.

=== Publications ===
- Historia de due amanti, Leonhard Pachel and Ulrich Schinzenzeler, s. d., Milan, c.1483.
- Delle guerre esterne de' romani traduit par Alessandro Braccio secretario fiorentino, Euchario Silber, Rome, 1502.
- Delle guerre civili de' romani tradotto da m. Alessandro Braccio secretario fiorentino, Eredi di Filippo Giunta, Florence, 1519.
- Tutti i Trionfi, Carri, Mascherate o Canti carnascialeschi andati per Firenze dal tempo del Magnifico Lorenzo de' Medici fino all'anno 1559, Lucques, 1750, p. 548-555.
- Alexandri Braccii Carmina, A. Perosa, Olschki, Florence, 1954.

== Bibliography (in Italian) ==
- Bice Agnoletti, Alessandro Braccesi. Contributo alla storia dell’Umanesimo e della poesia volgare, Passeri, Florence,1901, réhedité par Adelmo Polla, Rome, 1988.
- Alessandro Perosa, Braccesi, Alessandro, in «Repertorio degli umanisti italiani», Istituto nazionale di Studi sul Rinascimento, Florence, 1943.
- Alessandro Perosa, Braccesi, Alessandro, in «Dizionario Biografico degli Italiani», XIII, Istituto dell'Enciclopedia italiana, Rome, 1971.
- Paolo Viti, I volgarizzamenti di Alessandro Braccesi dell'Historia de duobus amantibus di Enea Silvio Piccolomini, in «Esperienze letterarie», VII, 1982.
