= Cornelis Marinus Francken =

Dutch classical scholar

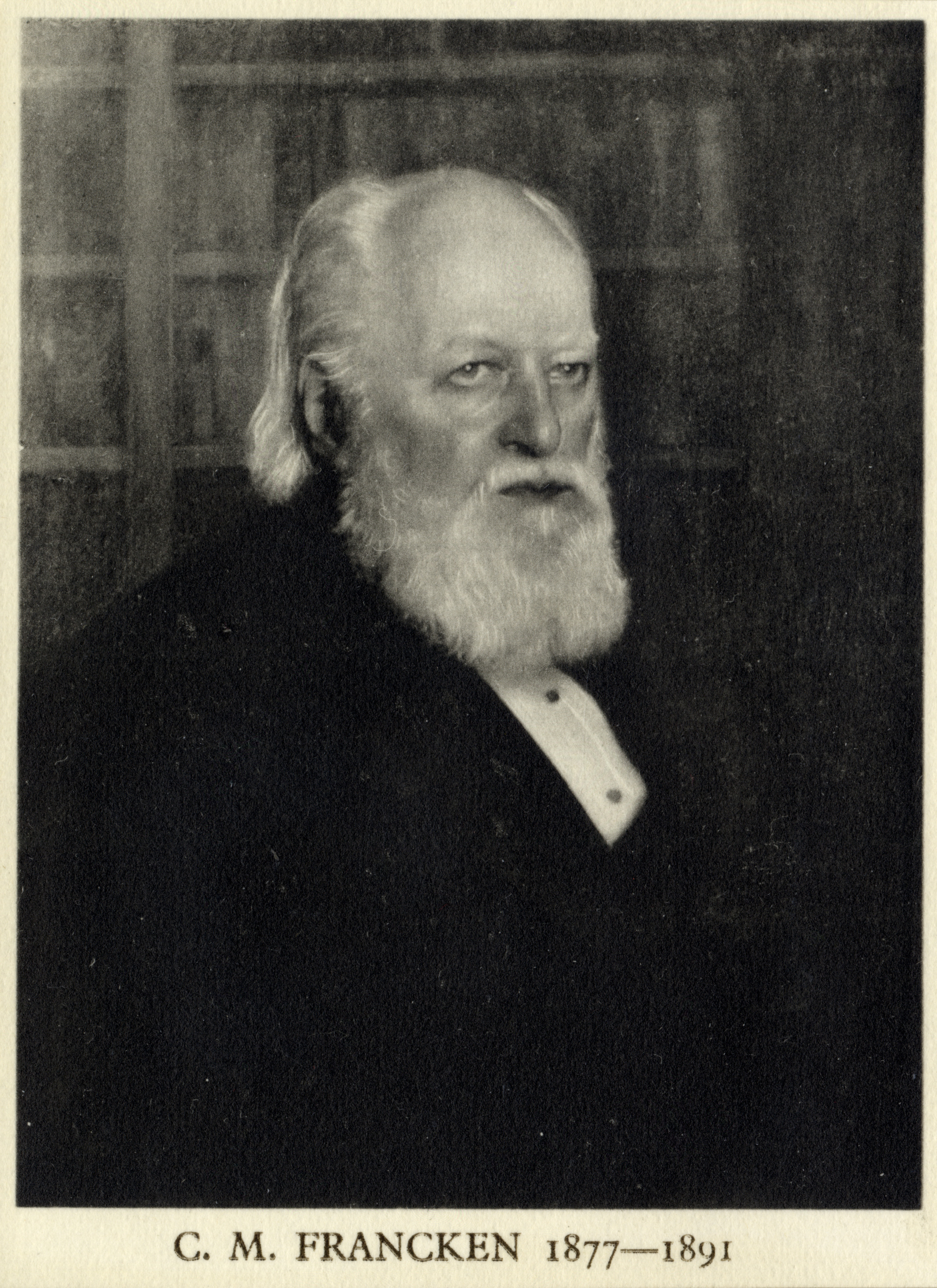
C. M. Francken in his later years

Cornelis (Cornelius) Marinus Francken (7 December 1820, Muiden — 4 July 1900, Utrecht) was a Dutch classical scholar. He was a pupil of Simon Karsten and professor at Groningen and Utrecht. At first his interest was in Greek literature, but subsequently in changed into Latin. He resigned in 1891.

He published critical editions of Plautus's Aulularia (1877) and Lucan's Pharsalia (1896). Among his major publications are critical notes to all extant speeches of Lysias (1865) and to a series of fragments of Satires by Lucilius (1869).

== Writings (selection) ==
- Disputatio critica de antiquarum Aeschyli interpretationum ad genuinam lectionem restituendam usu et auctoritate. Utrecht: Kemink, 1845 google books
- Aiacis Sophocleae metra. Groningen: R. J. Schierbeek, 1857. google books
- Commentationes Lysiacae. Utrecht: Keminck, 1865. archive.org
- Coniectanea critica ad C. Lucilii librorum decadem primam. Amsterdam: C. G. van der Post, 1869
- T. Macci Plauti Aulularia met aanteekeningen. Groningen: J. B. Wolters, 1877. google books
- M. Annaei Lucani Pharsalia cum commentario critico. Adiectae sunt Lucani vitae antiquae. Leiden: A. W. Sijthoff, n.d. [1896] google books
  - Vol. I: Libri I–V archive.org
  - Vol. II: Libri VI–X. Vitae. Epitaphion. Epilogus. Index. Addenda et corrigenda archive.org

=== Minor publications ===
- Annotationes ad Lysiam / Philologus 19 (1863). S. 315–318, 710–717
- Varroniana / Mnemosyne XXVIII (1900). S. 281–297, 395, 422–435

== Sources ==
- J. van der Vliet. Cornelis Marinus Francken / Jaarboek van de Koninklijke Akademie van Wetenschappen, 1902. S. 1–22. google books
- Sandys, John Edwin (1908). A History of Classical Scholarship. Vol. III. Cambridge: University Press. p. 282.
