= Ludwig Boltzmann Institute for Neo-Latin Studies =

Research institute of the Austrian Ludwig Boltzmann Gesellschaft

Coordinates: 48.2283°N 16.3551°E

The Ludwig Boltzmann Institute for Neo-Latin Studies (LBI; German: Ludwig Boltzmann Institut für Neulateinische Studien) in Innsbruck is a research institute of the Austrian Ludwig Boltzmann Gesellschaft. Partner organizations of the LBI are the University of Innsbruck, the University of Freiburg, the Austrian National Library in Vienna, and the Pontificio Comitato di Scienze Storiche in Rome.

The LBI was founded in 2011 and is dedicated to the study of Neo-Latin literature. It particularly focuses on the significance of Neo-Latin literature in the formation of Early Modern Europe. The LBI attempts to flesh out the idea that today's Europe would look very differently without the contribution of Neo-Latin literature. This idea is explored by means of examples from three lines of research.

== Lines of research ==
Each line of research is represented by two specific projects:

- Neo-Latin and religion: 1) Catholic school drama of the 18th century and its relation to the Enlightenment. - 2) Neo-Latin hymnography and its significance for contemporaneous piety.
- Neo-Latin and politics: 1) The role of Neo-Latin literature in the multilingual Habsburg Empire. - 2) The early-modern grammaticalization of the vernaculars on the model of the Latin language.
- Neo-Latin and 'histoire des mentalités': 1) The 'discovery of the mountains' in Neo-Latin authors of the 16th century. - 2) The anticipation of a 'romantic' poetics of individual expression in Neo-Latin poetry.

== See also ==
- Neo-Latin studies
- List of Neo-Latin authors
