= Portrait of a Boy =

1495 painting by Pietro Perugino

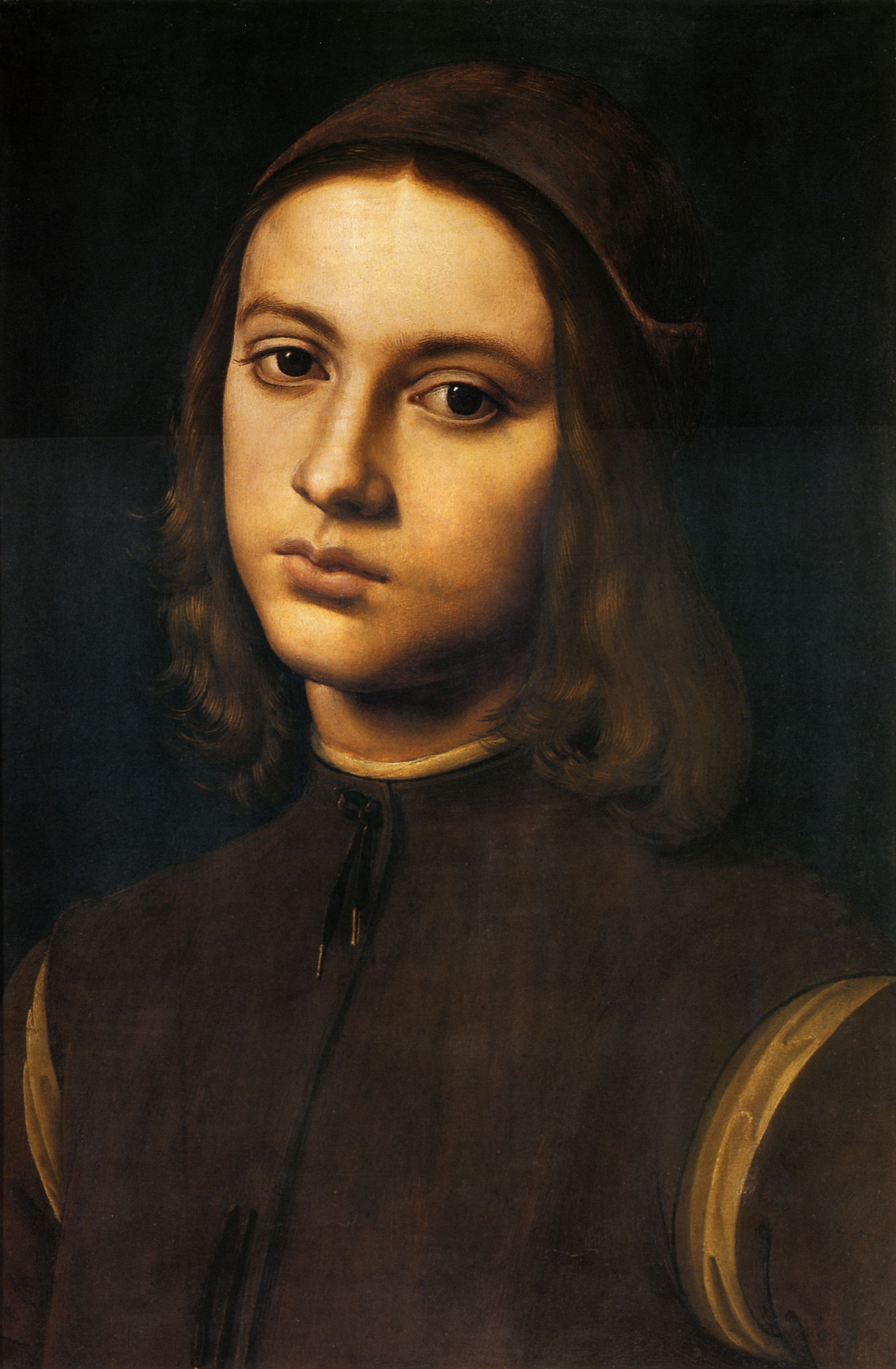
- Artist: Perugino
- Year: 1495
- Medium: oil on panel
- Dimensions: 37 cm × 26 cm (15 in × 10 in)
- Location: Uffizi, Florence

Portrait of a Boy is a 1495 oil on panel portrait, now in the Uffizi in Florence. In the past it has been attributed to Lorenzo di Credi, Viti, Jacopo Francia, Raphael and others, but Giovanni Morelli's reattribution of it to Perugino is now widely accepted. Although the lack of a landscape background is unusual for this painter, the style is typical of his portrait technique.

The subject was long identified as Alessandro Braccesi, but is now held to be unknown. A copy of the work is in the Galleria Borghese in Rome.

== Sources ==
- (in Italian) AA.VV., Galleria degli Uffizi, collana I Grandi Musei del Mondo, Scala Group, Rome, 2003.
- (in Italian) Vittoria Garibaldi, Perugino, in Pittori del Rinascimento, Scala, Florence, 2004 ISBN 888117099X
- (in Italian) Pierluigi De Vecchi, Elda Cerchiari, I tempi dell'arte, volume 2, Bompiani, Milan, 1999 ISBN 88-451-7212-0
- (in Italian) Stefano Zuffi, Il Quattrocento, Electa, Milan, 2004 ISBN 8837023154
- (in Italian) Entry on Polomuseale.firenze.it
