= Neo-Latin studies =

Study of Latin literature from the Italian Renaissance to the present day

Neo-Latin studies is the study of Latin and its literature from the Italian Renaissance to the present day. Neo-Latin is important for understanding early modern European culture and society, including the development of literature, science, religion and vernacular languages.

The study of Neo-Latin began to gain momentum as a specific topic in the 1970s. The International Association for Neo-Latin Studies was founded in 1971, leading to a series of conferences. The first major guide to the field appeared in 1977.

While the topic is reasonably easy to define, the result is a very wide topic, covering many centuries, different subject matter and a very wide geographical spread, creating significant challenges for methodology. Nevertheless, the literature is often some of the most significant output of the period:

we are dealing with literature (in the wider sense of the word) that witnesses the development of ideas and knowledge in Europe for almost four hundred years, indeed, with texts that are in reality very often the chief and most important sources for the investigation of the history of learning and culture. It is remarkable that many learned scholars today are unaware of the existence of this huge treasury.

Study of Neo-Latin is necessarily cross-disciplinary and requires Latinists to engage with audiences who are unfamiliar with Latin and the extent of contributions in Latin to their own fields, which are usually untranslated and untranscribed. Part of the work of the field is to make texts accessible, and translated, and another is to help non-Latinists to engage with the material and where necessary to challenge misconceptions about the nature of Latin writing in the period. Such misconceptions include the longevity of the relevance of Latin, which is typically underestimated, the "derivative" nature of Neo-Latin writing, or that it competed, in direct opposition, with vernaculars. Neo-Latin studies help reveal subtler relationships between languages, through promotion of standardisation and cross fertilisation through introducing new models of genre, for example.

The relevance of Neo-Latin studies to other areas of enquiry can be said to decline after 1800, when Latin has become much more marginal to the production of knowledge in Europe.

== Challenges ==
Neo-Latin studies suffer from being a relatively new discipline, without large resources attached to it. Longer term, there are challenges from the predominance of English, as Neo-Latin needs to be studied with knowledge of the vernaculars of the period, as well as the decline in confidence in Latin even among Renaissance scholars.

Where it meets linguistic questions, Neo-Latin studies does not have a clear remit within studies of Latin, which often do not look at post-Classical Latin in depth: "Despite the number and importance of the texts written in Latin of the Modern Era, the overwhelming bulk of linguistic research is still limited to its ancient varieties." This is especially striking given the vast size of the Neo-Latin corpus, which is currently simply unquantifiable.

== Key publications and organisations ==
=== Handbooks and guides to Neo-Latin ===
- Ford, Philip; Bloemendal, Jan; Fantazzi, Charles, eds. (2014). Brill's Encyclopaedia of the Neo-Latin World. Vol. I & II. The Netherlands: Brill.
- IJsewijn, Jozef; Sacré, Dirk (1990–1998). Companion to Neo-Latin Studies. Vol. I & II. Leuven University Press.
- Moul, Victoria, ed. (2017). A Guide to Neo-Latin Literature. Cambridge, United Kingdom: Cambridge University Press. ISBN 9781108820066. OL 29875053M.
- Knight, Sarah; Tilg, Stefan, eds. (2015). The Oxford Handbook of Neo-Latin. New York: Oxford University Press. ISBN 9780190886998. OL 28648475M.

=== Journals ===
- Humanistica Lovaniensia: Journal of Neo-Latin Studies (open access)
- Neulateinisches Jahrbuch
- Neo-Latin News (Open Access)
- Studi Umanistici Picensi
- Archivum Mentis

=== Series ===
- Noctes Neolatinae
- Europa Humanistica
- Bibliotecha Latinitatis Novae
- Supplementa Humanistica Lovaniensa
- Officina Latinae: Selected Writings from the Neo-Latin World

=== Editions ===
- I Tatti Renaissance Library, Harvard University Press
- Bloomsbury Neo-Latin texts and anthologies

=== Associations and societies ===
- "American Association for Neo-Latin Studies". York University Canada.
- "International Association for Neo-Latin Studies". IANLS.
- "Society for Neo-Latin Studies". Warwick University.

=== Institutes and departments ===
- Ludwig Boltzmann Institute for Neo-Latin Studies
- "Centre for Neo-Latin Studies, Cork". University College Cork.
- "Seminarium Philologiae Humanisticae". KU Leuven.

== Notable academics ==
- Ingrid De Smet
- Jozef IJsewijn
- Milena Minkova
- Monique Mund-Dopchie
- Dirk Sacré
- Gilbert Tournoy
- Terence Tunberg
- Françoise Waquet
- Jan Hendrik Waszink

== See also ==
- List of Neo-Latin authors

== Sources ==
=== Neo Latin studies ===
- van Hal, Toon (2007). "Towards Meta-neo-Latin Studies? Impetus to Debate on the Field of Neo-Latin Studies and its Methodology". Humanistica Lovaniensia. 56: 349–365. JSTOR 23974123.
- Demo, Šime (2022). "A paradox of the linguistic research of Neo–Latin. Symptoms and causes". Suvremena Lingvistika. 48 (93). doi:10.22210/suvlin.2022.093.01.
- De Smet, Ingrid A. R. 1999. "Not for Classicists? The State of Neo-Latin Studies". Journal of Roman Studies 89: 205–9.
- Kallendorf, Craig (2016). "Recent Trends in Neo-Latin Studies". Renaissance Quarterly. 69 (2): 617–629. doi:10.1086/687611. JSTOR 26559786. S2CID 163258795.
- Ford, Philip (2000). "Twenty-Five Years of Neo-Latin Studies". Neulateinisches Jahrbuch. 2: 293–301.
- Helander, Hans (2001). "Neo-Latin Studies: Significance and Prospects". Symbolae Osloenses. 76 (1): 5–102. doi:10.1080/003976701753387950. S2CID 161755340.
- Hofmann, Heinz (2017). "Some considerations on the theoretical status of Neo-Latin studies". Humanistica Lovaniensia. 66: 513–526. JSTOR 26871662.

=== Neo Latin ===
- Bloemendal, Jan, and Howard B. Norland, eds. 2013. Neo-Latin Drama and Theatre in Early Modern Europe. Leiden, The Netherlands: Brill.
- Butterfield, David. 2011. "Neo-Latin". In A Blackwell Companion to the Latin Language. Edited by James Clackson, 303–18. Chichester, UK: Wiley-Blackwell.
- Deneire, Thomas, ed. (2014). Dynamics of Neo-Latin and the Vernacular: Language and Poetics, Translation and Transfer. Leiden: Koninklijke Brill. ISBN 9789004269071.
- Haskell, Yasmin, and Juanita Feros Ruys, eds. 2010. Latin and Alterity in the Early Modern Period. Arizona Studies in the Middle Ages and Renaissance 30. Tempe: Arizona Univ. Press
- Tournoy, Gilbert, and Terence O. Tunberg. 1996. "On the Margins of Latinity? Neo-Latin and the Vernacular Languages". Humanistica Lovaniensia 45:134–175.

=== General ===
- Bergin, Thomas G; Law, Jonathan; Speake, Jennifer, eds. (2004). Encyclopedia of the Renaissance and Reformation. Facts On File. ISBN 0816054517. OL 3681138M.
- Burnett, Charles, and Nicholas Mann, eds. 2005. Britannia Latina: Latin in the Culture of Great Britain from the Middle Ages to the Twentieth Century. Warburg Institute Colloquia 8. London: Warburg Institute.
- Churchill, Laurie J., Phyllis R. Brown, and Jane E. Jeffrey, eds. 2002. Women Writing in Latin: From Roman Antiquity to Early Modern Europe. Vol. 3, Early Modern Women Writing Latin. New York: Routledge.
- Tore, Janson (2007). A Natural History of Latin. Translated by Merethe Damsgaard Sorensen; Nigel Vincent. Oxford University Press.
- LaCourse Munteanu, Dana; Martirosova Torlone, Zara; Dutsch, Dorota, eds. (2017). A Handbook to Classical Reception in Eastern and Central Europe. Wiley-Blackwell.
- Leonhardt, Jürgen (2009). Latin: story of a World Language. Translated by Kenneth Kronenberg. Harvard. ISBN 9780674659964. OL 35499574M.
- Ostler, Nicholas (2009). Ad Infinitum: A Biography of Latin. HarperPress. ISBN 978-0007343065.
- Waquet, Françoise [in French] (2001). Latin, or the Empire of a Sign: From the Sixteenth to the Twentieth Centuries. Translated by John Howe. Verso. ISBN 1-85984-402-2.
