= Lucrezia Borgia (1940 film) =

- Directed by: Hans Hinrich
- Written by: Luigi Bonelli; Tomaso Smith
- Starring: Isa Pola; Friedrich Benfer; Carlo Ninchi; Nerio Bernardi
- Cinematography: Otello Martelli
- Edited by: Eraldo Da Roma
- Music by: Giuseppe Mulè
- Production company: Scalera Film
- Distributed by: Scalera Film
- Release date: 29 November 1940
- Running time: 76 minutes
- Country: Italy
- Language: Italian

Lucrezia Borgia is a 1940 Italian historical film directed by Hans Hinrich and starring Isa Pola, Friedrich Benfer and Carlo Ninchi. The film portrays the life of Lucrezia Borgia (1480-1519), one of a number of Italian films of the era set during the Renaissance. It was made at the Scalera Studios in Rome.

== Cast ==
- Isa Pola as Lucrezia Borgia
- Friedrich Benfer as Alessandro Strozzi
- Carlo Ninchi as Ranuccio
- Nerio Bernardi as Alfonsino d'Este, duca di Ferrara
- Pina De Angelis as Barbara Torelli
- Luigi Almirante as Riccio, il giullare
- Guido Lazzarini as Pietro Bembo
- Lina Marengo as La nutrice di Barbara
- Nicola Maldacea as Cosimo
- Giulio Tempesti as L'ambasciatore di Milano
- Amina Pirani Maggi as Beatrice
- Giovanni Stupin as Il taverniere
- Luigi Zerbinati as Un ubriaco nella taverna
- Juan Calvo as Una spia di Riccio nella taverna

== Bibliography ==
- Moudarres, Andrea & Purdy Moudarres, Christiana. New Worlds and the Italian Renaissance: Contributions to the History of European Intellectual Culture. BRILL, 2012.
