= Ingrid De Smet =

Ingrid A. R. De Smet, FBA, is an academic, specialising in the intellectual culture of early modern France and the Low Countries. She is Professor of French and Neo-Latin studies at the University of Warwick.

== Career ==
De Smet completed a postgraduate diploma at the Université Catholique de Louvain, and then carried out doctoral studies at St John's College, Cambridge, graduating PhD in 1993 with a thesis on Neo-Latin Menippean satire in the Low Countries and France. After that she spent three years as a prize fellow at Magdalen College, Oxford, and commenced a two-year British Academy postdoctoral fellowship in 1995. She then joined the University of Warwick as a lecturer in 1997, where she was later appointed Professor of French and Neo-Latin Studies; in 2007, she was appointed Director of the Centre for Study of the Renaissance, although she stepped between 2011 and 2014 when she held a Leverhulme Major Research Fellow; when that expired in 2014, she returned to her directorship.

According to her British Academy profile, De Smet's research focuses on "Renaissance and Early Modern intellectual culture, especially in France and the Low Countries; sixteenth and early-seventeenth century French literature; Neo-Latin Studies; the Republic of Letters; [and] the Classical tradition".

== Awards and honours ==
In 2014, De Smet was elected a Fellow of the British Academy, the United Kingdom's national academy for the humanities and social sciences. She has also received a doctor of letters degree from the University of Warwick.
