= Ercole Strozzi =

Italian poet

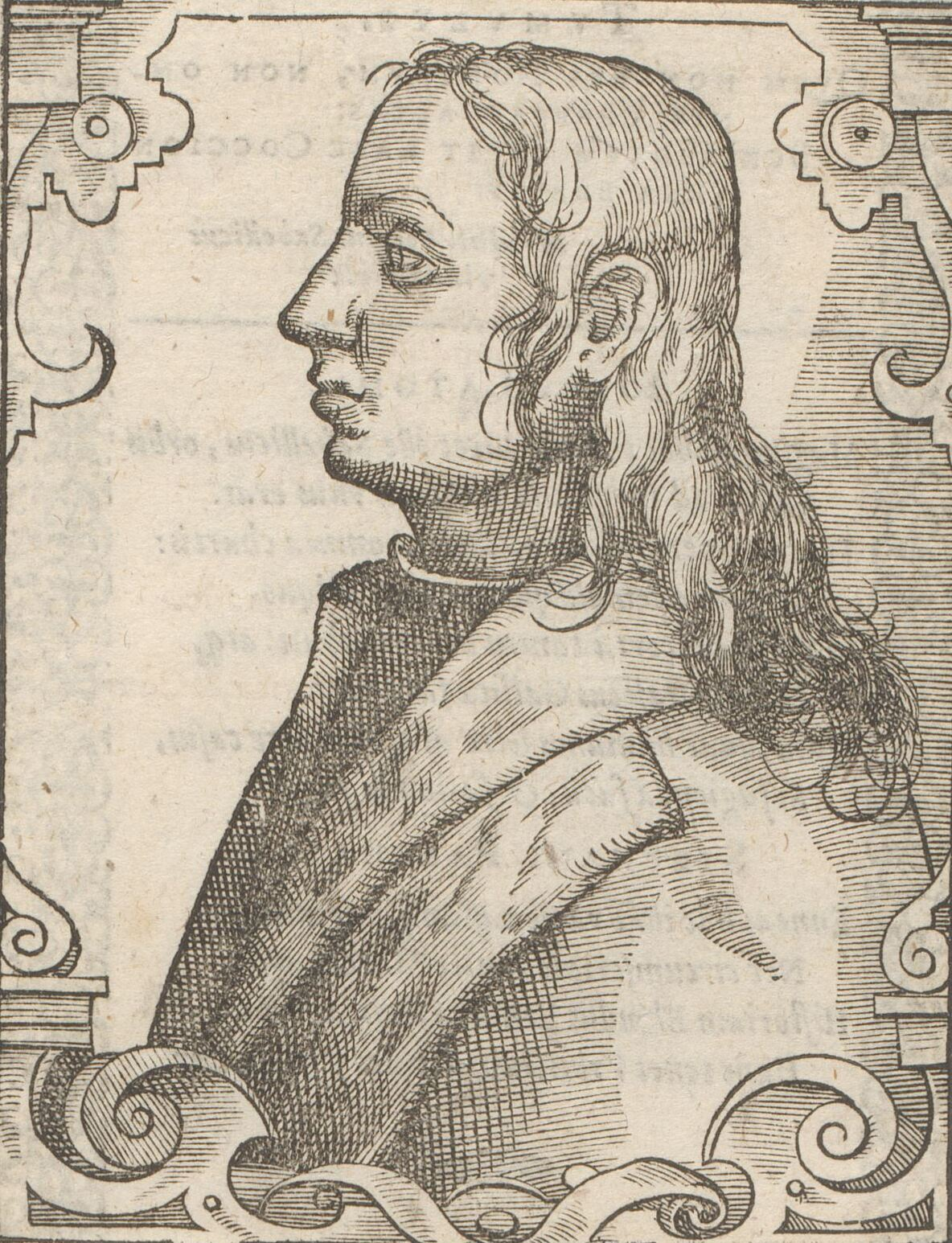
Portrait of Ercole Strozzi by Tobias Stimmer

Ercole Strozzi (Ferrara, September 2, 1473 – Ferrara, June 6, 1508) was an Italian poet, the son of Tito Vespasiano Strozzi. He was a friend of Lucrezia Borgia, to whom he dedicated the poem La caccia. He married the poet Barbara Torelli and was murdered in Ferrara by an unknown assailant.

== Murder ==
On the morning of 6 June 1508, the body of Ercole Strozzi was found on the road near the Church of San Francesco in Ferrara, at the corner of via Praisolo and via Savonarola, near the wall of casa Romei. The lack of blood at the scene indicated that he had been moved. He had been out riding his mule the day before when he was ambushed and stabbed 22 times. His brothers, Lorenzo and Guido Strozzi, beseeched Francesco Gonzaga to avenge the death, but the perpetrators were never discovered; his wife, Barabara, also sought Gonzaga's protection following this event. Ercole's daughter was only 13 days old at the time of the murder. Ercole also had another child by her and two other illegitimate children. Pope Julius II accused his inveterate enemy, the then Duke of Ferrara, Alfonso I d'Este, of playing a role in the murder of Ercole.
