= Burchiello =

Italian poet

- Posthumous portrait (c. 1552—1568) by Cristofano dell'Altissimo.
- Born: Domenico di Giovanni; 1404; Florence, Republic of Florence
- Died: 1449 (aged 44–45); Rome, Papal States
- Occupations: Poet; Barber
- Known for: Poesia alla burchia
- Writing career
- Language: Florentine dialect
- Period: Early Renaissance
- Genres: Comic poetry; sonnets; sonetti caudati; tenzoni

Burchiello (born Domenico di Giovanni; 1404–1449) was an Italian poet and barber from Florence. He is best known for his sonetti alla burchia, comic verse combining apparently incongruous images, colloquial expressions and wordplay within regular poetic forms. His poems helped establish a distinctive form of vernacular comic poetry in fifteenth-century Tuscany.

Works attributed to Burchiello range from alla burchia sonnets to personal satire, invective and verse exchanges (tenzoni). His name also became associated with a poetic style imitated during and after his lifetime. Not all poems preserved under his name, however, are considered authentic.

Details of Burchiello's life remain uncertain. Older accounts portrayed him as an opponent of Cosimo de' Medici driven into exile in 1434 and described his shop as a meeting place for literary figures. Archival research by Luca Boschetto has challenged these accounts by distinguishing records of his working life from inferences drawn from poems attributed to him.

== Life ==
=== Origins and profession ===
Domenico di Giovanni was born in 1404 in the Santa Maria Novella quarter of Florence. The Florentine catasto of 1427 records him as a member of a modest artisan household: his father was a carpenter, and other relatives worked in the city's craft and textile trades. At the age of 23, Domenico was employed by a barber for an annual wage of fourteen florins.

In fifteenth-century Florence, barbers performed minor medical procedures, including bloodletting and tooth extraction, as well as shaving and cutting hair. They were enrolled in the Arte dei Medici e Speziali, the guild of physicians and apothecaries. Contemporary shop inventories list razors, basins, towels, chairs and vessels for heating water; several of these objects recur in the poems associated with Burchiello.

Burchiello was seeking to operate his own business by 1428, when he rented premises near the Mercato Nuovo from Giovanni di Antonio de' Nobili. A dispute over the condition of the property led to proceedings before the Mercanzia, Florence's commercial court. He was arrested at the landlord's request on 13 June 1431 and released after depositing the contested amount. On 28 September, the court ordered him to pay six and a half florins of the twelve claimed, together with legal expenses.

Another dispute in 1431 concerned a debt owed to Burchiello by the barber Cambio di Marco. Acting through his representative Leonardo Dati, he sought Cambio's imprisonment for non-payment but later requested his release. Burchiello took a shop in Calimaruzza in May 1432 and enrolled in the barbers' guild the next month.

== Bibliography (in Italian) ==
- Giuseppe Crimi (ed.), 30 sonetti del Burchiello, Viareggio, Diaforia, Edizioni Cinquemarzo, 2016.
- Giuseppe Crimi (ed.), L'oscura lingua e il parlar sottile: tradizione e fortuna del Burchiello, Roma, Vecchiarelli, 2005.
- Michelangelo Zaccarello (ed.), " I sonetti del Burchiello", Torino, Einaudi, 2004.
- Michelangelo Zaccarello (ed.), "La fantasia fuor de' confini - Burchiello e dintorni a 550 anni dalla morte", Ediz. di Storia e Letteratura, Roma, 2002.

== External links (in Italian) ==
- (PDF) Il testo delle Rime di Burchiello secondo l'edizione critica di Michelangelo Zaccarello
- Burchiello; Bellincioni, Bernardo (1757). "Riproduzione digitale della stampa pseudolondinese del 1757 Sonetti del Burchiello, del Bellincioni e d'altri poeti fiorentini alla burchiellesca".
- https://gutenberg.beic.it/webclient/DeliveryManager?pid=1547853&custom_att_2=simple_viewer&search_terms=DTL8&pds_handle=
- http://www.treccani.it/enciclopedia/domenico-di-giovanni-detto-il-burchiello_(Dizionario_Biografico)/
- "Entry on Burchiello di Liberliber" (in Italian). Archived from the original on 2008-06-11.
