= Tito Vespasiano Strozzi =

Italian Renaissance poet (1424–1505)

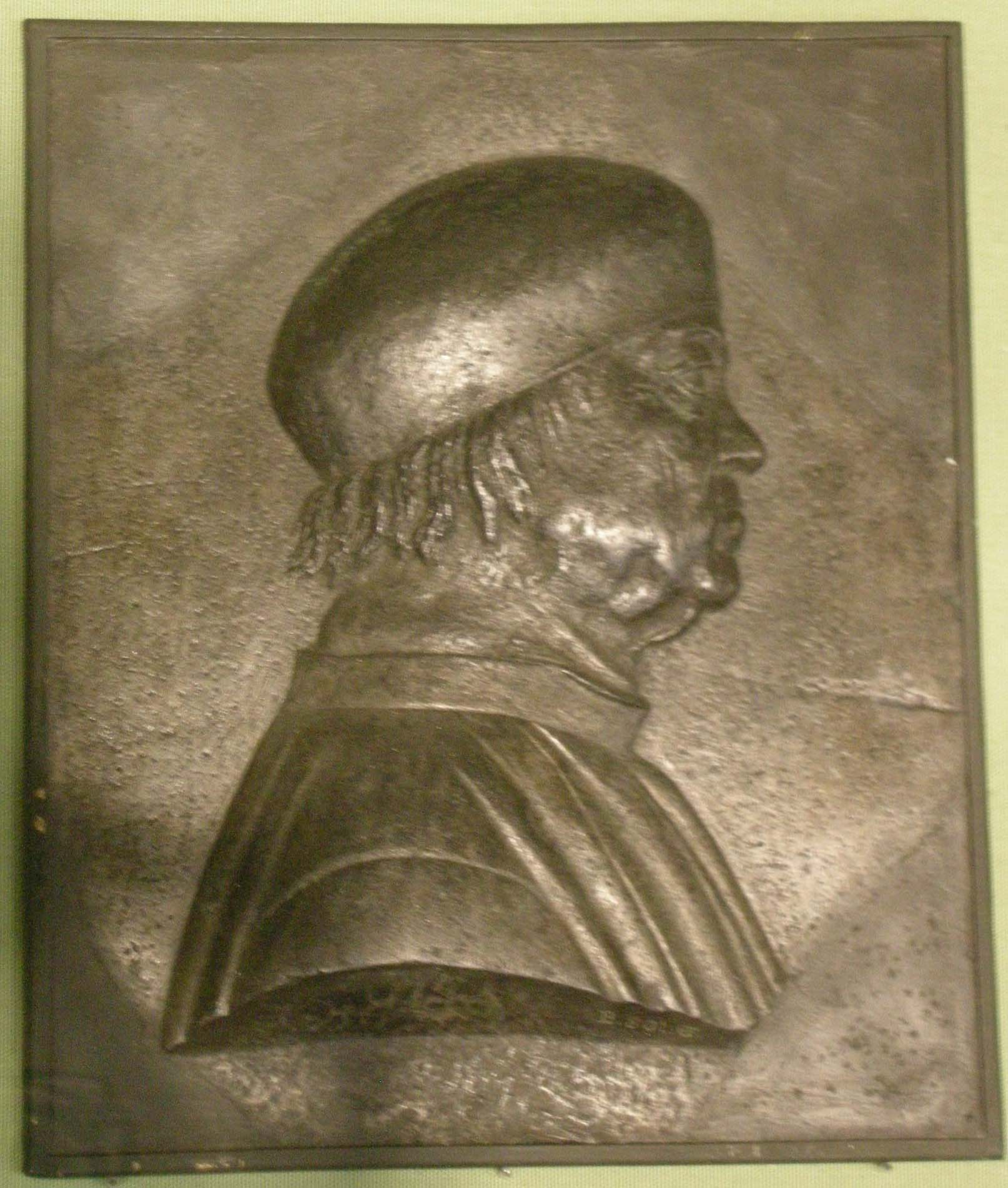
Tito Vespasiano Strozzi.

Tito Vespasiano Strozzi (Ferrara, 1424 – c. 1505) was an Italian Renaissance poet at the Este court of Ferrara, who figures as an interlocutor in Angelo Decembrio's De politia litteraria ("On literary polish").

A member of the Strozzi family exiled from Florence, son of Giovanni, who served in Ferrara as Niccolò III d'Este's commander, Tito was a patrician of Ferrara, where he was educated in humanistic culture. He was a courtier of successive dukes of Ferrara, Leonello, Borso, and Ercole d'Este, and was entrusted with several important posts in the civil magistrature. He was the official champion of the Duke of Ferrara (1473), served as Governor of Rovigo and the Polesine (1473–84) then Giudice dei Savi (1497–1505), in which post he was succeeded by his son Ercole Strozzi. Strozzi was included in the entourage that accompanied Borso to Rome, March 1471, to be elevated from marchese to duca di Ferrara by Pope Sixtus IV Della Rovere.

His portrait in profile, bearing the signature of Baldassare d'Este (natural son of Niccolò III d'Este) and the date 1499, was in the collection of Vittorio Cini at Palazzo Loredan Cini.

== Works ==
He is more remembered for his humanistic compositions in Latin and some sonnets in Italian. He is said to have spent a lifetime polishing the amorous verses written in the first flush of his youth. His literary style was formed at Verona under the guidance of Guarino.

Among his works are the six books of the Eroticon, a series of elegies in refined Latin verse fusing Latin classical training with the spirit of Petrarch. A fine illuminated manuscript of them, with gold initials and illuminated margins, was purchased by the humanist Celio Calcagnini from the extensive former library of the Aragonese kings of Naples, dispersed by Isabella del Balzo, the deposed queen.

His heroic Borsiade celebrating his patron Borso d'Este is lost, save a few fragments. There are also epigrams, and sermons. His collected opere were published by Aldus Manutius in 1513, together with works of his son Ercole Strozzi (1471–1508), under the title Strozii poëtae pater et filius.
