= Uberto Decembrio =

Milanese Renaissance Humanist

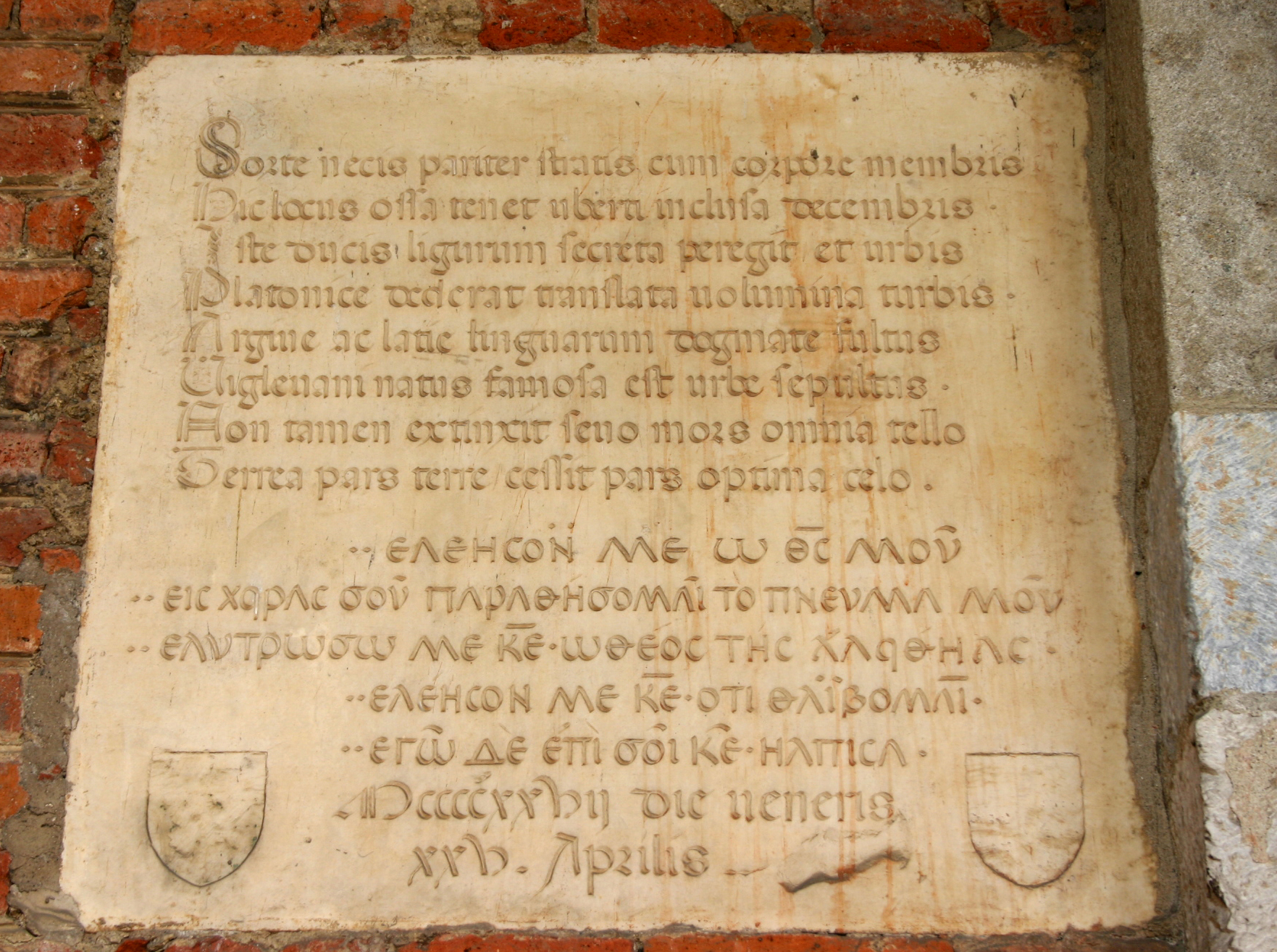
Tomb slab of Decembrio

Uberto Decembrio (1350–1427) was a Milanese Renaissance Humanist who worked for the Viscontis. He justified Visconti tyranny, tyranny meaning absolute rule by someone without noble title. In his De Re Publica, dedicated to Filippo Maria Visconti, he argued that public office should be open to all on the basis of talent. He justified Visconti tyranny as necessary for Italian unification and to end the factionalism endemic to republics, which were the same reasons Petrarch gave in favor of tyranny but at odds with both Guelph and Ghibeline ideas.

Uberto had four sons: Modesto, Pier Candido, Paolo Valerio and Angelo Camillo.
