= François Guyet =

French classical scholar

- Born: 1575; Angers, Anjou
- Died: 13 April 1655 (aged 79–80); Paris, Île-de-France

Academic work
- Discipline: Classical philology
- Institutions: University of Paris

François Guyet, also known as Guyetus, (1575 – 13 April 1655) was a French classical scholar. Born in Angers, he studied Classics at Paris and travelled to Italy and the Holy Roman Empire, making the acquaintances of various contemporary intellectuals. Back in France, he worked as a tutor at the estate of the aristocrat Jean Louis de Nogaret de La Valette.

After being named abbot of the priory Saint-Andrade, he lived and worked at the Collège de Bourgogne, a constituent college of the University of Paris. He is best known for his annotations on Latin and Ancient Greek texts, which were published after his death in 1655. Guyet's work includes comments on the Roman authors Terence, Vergil, Suetonius, and Phaedrus.

== Life ==
François Guyet was born in Angers in 1575. His family belonged to the region's upper class and his father René had been the mayor of Angers in 1555. Little is known about his childhood, though it is accepted that he moved to Paris in 1599, where he began studying the ancient world alongside the future scholar Pierre Dupuy at the residence of Jacques Auguste de Thou, who then served as the président à mortier, a high-ranking magistrate.

In the early 1600s, Guyet travelled extensively through Italy and the Holy Roman Empire. On his journeys, he made the acquaintances of several French intellectuals, including the satirist Mathurin Régnier and the theologian Gabriel de L'Aubespine. After his return to France, his connections with the essayist Jean-Louis Guez de Balzac helped Guyet to a position at the estate of the influential aristocrat Jean Louis de Nogaret de La Valette, whose third son he tutored. As a reward for his service to the family, he was made the abbot of the priory Saint-Andrade in the diocese of Bordeaux.

His position as abbot provided Guyet with the financial stability to begin teaching at the Collège de Bourgogne, a constituent college of the University of Paris. This period saw the majority of his scholarly production on Latin and Ancient Greek literature. Having enjoyed robust health for his times, Guyet suffered from kidney stone disease in his later life. At the age of fifty-one, he faced a lithotomy, which was at that time known as the "operation for the stone" and almost always caused the death of the patient. Guyet would not agree to be tied down, and during the operation he neither uttered a cry, nor breathed a sigh, keeping his eyes fixed on his copy of Lucan's Pharsalia, on the verses Lucan is said to have recited while dying. He survived the ordeal and lived many more years.

Guyet died on 13 April 1655 and was buried at the church of Saints Cosmas and Damian in the 6th arrondissement of modern-day Paris.

== Work ==
After his death, editions of Guyet's annotations on the work of various classical authors were published. His works include comments on the historian Suetonius (edited by Johann Georg Graevius), the fabulist Phaedrus, the comedian Terence, and Vergil.

== Works cited ==
- Eichfelder, Sandra (2008). Die Edition der handschriftlichen Randnoten des Francois Guyet (1575–1655) zu Vergil. Rahden.
- Graevius, Johann Georg (1672). C. Suetonius Tranquillus. Zyll.
- Guyet, François (1557). Francisci Guyeti in P. Terentii Comoedias VI. commentarii. Strasbourg.
- Guyet, François; Scheffer, Johannes (1673). Phaedri Fabularum Aesopiarum libri quinque. Hamburg.
- Nodier, Charles (1829). Mélanges tirés d'une petite bibliothèque. Paris: Crapelet.
- Uri, Isaac (1886). Un cercle savant au xviie siècle. François Guyet. Paris.
