= Angelo Decembrio =

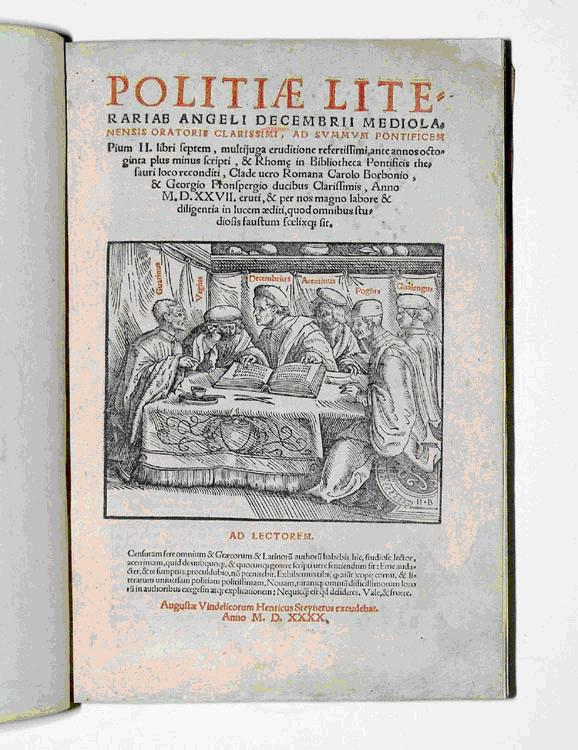
Title page from the first printed edition of De politiæ litterariæ, Augsburg, 1540.

Angelo Camillo Decembrio (1415 — after 1467) was a Milanese humanist who began his career in Ferrara, where he arrived in 1430. The son of Uberto Decembrio, who was the first Renaissance translator of Plato's Republic, and outshone among his contemporaries by his brother Pier Candido, Angelo is known especially for the seven books of literary dialogues of De politiæ litterariæ ("On literary polish", not printed until 1540), which provide a vivid record— though synthesized in retrospect— of literary life at the court of Leonello d'Este of Ferrara, Taking as its main concern the question of how to achieve and maintain the literary polish characteristic of the civilized man in a courtly environment, Decembrio's unique dialogues elaborating aspects of this central idea take as personae his patron Leonello d'Este, who serves as the questioner, with the great teacher Guarino of Verona, Leonello's former tutor; the architect, theorist and humanist Leon Battista Alberti; the poet Tito Vespasiano Strozzi. They debate the comparative value of ancient and modern poetry, discuss the quality of works of art, examine the Egyptian obelisk that still stands in Vatican City in the Piazza S. Pietro; and describe the ideal renaissance library and how it should be organized.

Two manuscript versions of Decembrio's Politia litteraria were kept in the Vatican Library; from one that was stolen and subsequently lost, the edition of 1540 was printed; the other remains in the Vatican.

After Leonello's unexpected death (1450) Angelo sought patronage elsewhere, moving first to Barcelona, then spending time at the Neapolitan court of Alfonso the Great of Aragon, where his brother also served, and returning to Barcelona after Alfonso's death in 1458, at the invitation of Carlos de Aragon, Prince de Viana. On his return trip to Ferrara, travelling with the books he had accumulated, he was robbed by bandits working for Jacques d'Armagnac, itemizing his losses in a petition to Borso d'Este, brother of Leonello and himself a great patron of humanistic learning.

In 1467 he was offered a chair in Greek at the University of Perugia, but it is doubtful whether he took it up, and afterwards he disappears from view.
