= Martinus Dorpius =

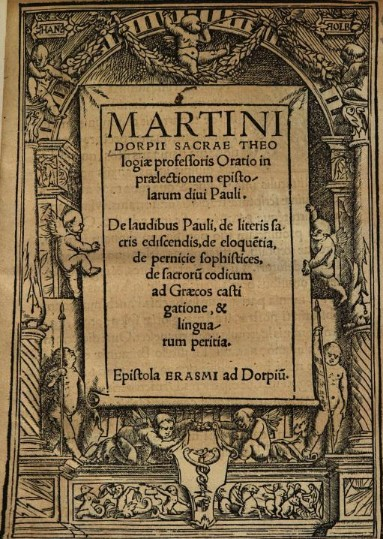

Martinus Dorpius or Maarten van Dorp (1485–1525) or Martin Dorp was a humanist and a theologian at the Old University of Leuven. He is best known as a friend and correspondent of Erasmus.

== Life ==
Dorpius was born in Naaldwijk near Rotterdam in 1485. His father, Bertelmees, was steward of Egmond Abbey and served for some years as an alderman of The Hague. His brother Willem followed in their father's footsteps. Martin, however, pursued an academic career. He graduated Bachelor of Arts at Leuven University in 1504, as fifth in his year. After graduation he began teaching rhetoric and philosophy at Lily College. He staged plays with his students, including Plautus' Miles Gloriosus and Aulularia, the latter of which he edited for publication.

In 1510 he delivered a lecture on the Assumption of Mary that was to be printed in 1514 by Dirk Martens. In 1515 he graduated Doctor of Theology and was appointed president of Holy Ghost College.

He was a correspondent of Erasmus, tipping him off in 1514 that the theologians of Leuven were examining his Praise of Folly for indications of heterodoxy. In his correspondence he also questioned the usefulness of studying Greek to understand the New Testament. In 1515 one of his letters to Erasmus elicited a reply from Thomas More emphasizing the importance of Greek.

In the summer of 1516 Dorpius lectured on the Pauline epistles, declaring that his lack of Greek was an impediment to a thorough understanding of them, and also that an understanding of rhetoric (rather than of scholastic distinctions and definitions) was important to appreciate how Paul presented his teachings. That autumn, perhaps in response, the Faculty of Theology refused to renew Dorpius's certificate to lecture. His certificate was, however, renewed the following year. In 1517-18 he supported the foundation of the Collegium Trilingue.

In the summer of 1519 Dorpius resigned as college president and travelled to The Hague. In Holland he was offered a position as suffragan to Philip of Burgundy, bishop of Utrecht, but he declined and returned to Leuven. He served as rector of the university from February to August 1523. He died on 31 May 1525 and was buried in the Carthusian monastery in Leuven. An epitaph by Erasmus was carved on his tomb.

== Works ==
- Oratio de laudibus sigillatim cujusque disciplinarum (1513)
- Concio de divae virginis deiparae in coelum assumptione (1514)
- Oratio in praelectionem epistolarum Divi Pauli (1519)
- Other works as contributor.
