= Mencke =

Mencke is a German language surname. Notable people with the name include:

- Bruno Mencke (1876–1901), German explorer and collector
- Otto Mencke (1644–1707), German philosopher and scientist
