= Christopher Ocland =

English writer and school master

Christopher Ocland (died c. 1590) was an English writer and school master.

Ocland was born in Buckinghamshire and was headmaster of St Saviour's Grammar School in Southwark from 1562 to 1579. In approximately 1574 Ocland became the first master of Richard Pate's grammar school in Cheltenham.

In 1580 he published at his own expense his major work, the Anglorum proelia (‘The Battles of the English’), a Latin poem of almost 3500 Latin hexameters on the subject of England's military history from the reign of Edward III to Mary I. He updated the poem with Eirēnarchia, sive, Elizabetha (1582) which included celebratory pen portraits of the leading men of Elizabethan England.

Ocland's patriotism was commended at Queen Elizabeth's court and a republication of the two poems combined in a single edition appeared in 1582, prefaced with a command signed by Her Majesty's Privy Council that the poem should be taught in every grammar and free school in England. In 1585 John Sharrock translated the two poems into English under the titles The Valiant Actes and Victorious Battails of the English Nation and Elizabeth Queene.
