= Girolamo Baruffaldi =

Italian historian

Girolamo Baruffaldi (10 July 1740 – 2 February 1817) was an Italian historian who wrote a biography of artists active in Ferrara.

== Biography ==
Born in Ferrara, he studied initially with the Jesuit institute in Novellara, entered the order, and was busy in preaching and teaching rhetoric when the order was suppressed in 1773. He returned to his native city and, noted for his scholastic knowledge, became the librarian for the public library, permanent secretary of the Accademia Ariostea, and prefect of local education. He established religious guilds in Ferrara for artists and other citizens. He died impoverished.

== Works ==
- Vita della Beata Beatrice II.
- Saggio Letterario bibliografico della tipografia ferrarese.
- Manifesto di Domenico Barbierie.
- Notizia intorno a Pellegrino Maratti.
- Notizia dell'arrivo, passaggio e permanenza di parecchi romani pontefici in Ferrara.
- Commentario istorico della biblioteca ferrarese.
- Vita di don Claudio Tedeschi.
- Orazione per la promozione al cardinalato dell'amico Riminaldi.
- Riposta ad un amico laontano.
- Diatriba de veteri sigillo.
- Saggio biografico critico de' genitori di Lodovico Ariosto.
- Osservazioni sopra un'antica iscrizione di Vico Aventino.
- Riflessioni storico-critiche del canonoico Manini-Ferrani.
- Memorie istoriche de' letterati ferraresi del Barotti.
- Memorie di Bernardino Bartulcio.
- Timone, commedia di Matteo Boiardo, reviewed and corrected by Girolamo Baruffaldi, posthumous work.
