= Joannes Burmeister =

German neo-Latin poet laureate (1576–1638)

Joannes Burmeister (1576–1638) was a Neo-Latin poet laureate of the German Baroque period, known for his Christian adaptations of the classical Roman poets Martial and Plautus.

== Life ==
He was born in Lüneburg and was related to the musical theorist Joachim Burmeister. After studying theology at Rostock University, in July 1600 he was crowned an Imperial Poet Laureate of the Holy Roman Empire. He spent the next 25 years as pastor of the village of Gülzow. During that time he composed nearly all his works, some of which enjoyed the patronage of the Estorff family. In 1635 he became Provost of Uelzen, where three years later he died and was buried.

== Major works ==
1. Martialis Renati. Parodiarum Sacrarum M. Val. Martialis Epigrammata (Goslar and Lueneburg: Hans Stern and Johann Vogt, 1612). 3 volumes.
2. Saturnaliorum Christianorum Libri septem (Goslar, Johann Vogt, 1619).
3. M. A. Plauti Renati sive Sacri Mater-Virgo, comoedia prima ex Amphitruone ad Admirandum Conceptionis et Incarnationis Filii Dei Misterium inversa (Lüneburg, Andreas Michaelis, 1621).
4. M. A. Plauti renati sive sacri Aulularia, comoedia tertia ex fabula ethnica ad biblicam de Achanis furto historiam inversa (Hamburg, Joannes Mose, 1629).
