= Aulularia =

Ancient Roman play by Plautus

- Written by: Plautus
- Characters: Lar Familiaris; Euclio; Staphyla; Eunomia; Megadorus; Strobilus; Lyconides; Phaedria; Phygia
- Setting: a street in Athens, before the houses of Euclio and Megadorus, and the shrine of Fides

Aulularia is a Latin play by the early Roman playwright Titus Maccius Plautus. The title literally means The Little Pot, but some translators provide The Pot of Gold, and the plot revolves around a literal pot of gold which the miserly protagonist, Euclio, guards zealously. The play's ending does not survive, though there are indications of how the plot is resolved in later summaries and a few fragments of dialogue.

One scholar, R. L. Hunter, writes of this play: "The Aulularia has always been one of the most popular and most studied of Plautus' plays, both because of its intrinsic interest and quality and also because of its later influence in the European dramatic tradition."

== Plot summary ==
Lar Familiaris, the household deity of Euclio, an old man with a marriageable daughter named Phaedria, begins the play with a prologue about how he allowed Euclio to discover a pot of gold buried in his house. Euclio is then shown almost maniacally guarding his gold from real and imagined threats. Unknown to Euclio, Phaedria is pregnant by a young man named Lyconides. Phaedria is never seen on stage, though at a key point in the play the audience hears her painful cries in labor.

Euclio is persuaded to marry his daughter to his rich neighbor, an elderly bachelor named Megadorus, who happens to be the uncle of Lyconides. This leads to much by-play involving preparations for the nuptials. Eventually Lyconides and his slave appear, and Lyconides confesses to Euclio his ravishing of Phaedria. Lyconides' slave manages to steal the now notorious pot of gold. Lyconides confronts his slave about the theft.

At this point the manuscript breaks off. From surviving summaries of the play, we know that Euclio eventually recovers his pot of gold and gives it to Lyconides and Phaedria, who marry in a happy ending. In the Penguin Classics edition of the play, translator E. F. Watling devised an ending as it might have been originally, based on the summaries and a few surviving scraps of dialogue. Other writers over the centuries have also written endings for the play, with somewhat varying results (one version was produced by Antonio Urceo in the late 15th century, another by Martinus Dorpius in the early 16th century).

The setting is a street scene. On the left and right are the houses of Megadorus and Euclio. Between them is a temple dedicated to Fides "Faith" or "Loyalty", with an altar in front of it.

== Metrical structure ==
Plautus's plays are traditionally divided into five acts; these are referred to below for convenience, since many editions make use of them. However, it is not thought that they go back to Plautus's time, since no manuscript contains them before the 15th century. Also, the acts themselves do not always match the structure of the plays, which is more clearly shown by the variation in metres.

In Plautus's plays the usual pattern is to begin each section with iambic senarii (which were spoken without music), then a scene of music in various metres, and finally a scene in trochaic septenarii, which were apparently recited to the accompaniment of tibiae (a pair of reed pipes). Moore calls this the "ABC succession", where A = iambic senarii, B = other metres, C = trochaic septenarii. However, the ABC order is sometimes varied.

The scheme of the Aulularia is incomplete but the surviving part is as follows:

ABC, ABBC, AC, ABBC, ACB...

The second and fourth sections each have musical passages in two contrasting metres.

An unusual feature of the Aulularia is the 32 continuous lines of versus reiziani (415–446). In all the rest of Plautus's plays this metre is used in only 34 lines, mostly in single lines mixed with other metres. Moore, noting the somewhat jarring rhythm of the colon, or ending, of the line, writes: "The versus reizianus finds itself in some of Plautus' funniest scenes, as when Olympio discovers that his "bride" has a beard (Cas. 929)." Versus reiziani are also found, mixed with other metres ending in cola reiziana, in lines 153–160, where Eunomia is trying to convince her brother of the importance of getting married, while he resists her suggestions.

The structure of the play is as follows:

=== Megadorus proposes marriage ===
- Prologue; Act 1.1–1.2 (1-119): iambic senarii (119 lines)

The prologue is spoken by a Lar (household god or guardian spirit of the house). He explains that because the daughter of the house pays him so much respect he has allowed her father to find a treasure buried long ago by his grandfather. In this way he plans for the girl to have funds to marry the man who raped her. But to achieve this he intends first to cause the young man's uncle to propose to the girl.

Euclio, the master of the house, chases out his housekeeper, Staphyla, so that he can have privacy to check on his buried treasure. Then he comes out again and tells Staphyla to watch the house and let no one in while he goes to collect his share of a public distribution of money.

- Act 2.1 (120-160): mixed metres (ba, ia-tr, cr, an, versreiz) (41 lines)

Outside the house next door, Eunomia is urging her brother Megadorus to get married. She has in mind a rich older bride who will be suitable for him.

- Act 2.1 (cont.)–2.3 (161-279): trochaic septenarii (118 lines)

Megadorus, however, says he would prefer the young girl next door, who is poor. Now he sees Euclio coming. He speaks to Euclio and proposes to marry his daughter. Euclio is deeply suspicious and is sure Megadorus must have found out about the treasure. Eventually, however, he agrees, on condition that there should be no dowry given. Megadorus calls his slave Strobilus and they go off to buy things for the wedding. Euclio orders Staphyla to prepare the house for his daughter's wedding. Staphyla is horrified since she knows the girl is pregnant and foresees her disgrace.

=== The cooks cause a commotion ===
- Act 2.4–2.9 (280-405): iambic senarii (125 lines)

Strobilus returns from the market bringing food, two sheep, two dancing girls, and two cooks. He says he has instructions to divide these between the two houses. He describes to the cooks how mean Euclio is. Strobilus now tells one of the cooks, Congrio, and one music girl, to go to Euclio's house and the other to come with him to Megadorus's. When Congrio complains, Strobilus tells him that at least he won't be accused of stealing since Euclio has nothing to steal. He knocks on Euclio's door and asks Staphyla to admit the cook and his assistants and the music girl. As Strobilus returns home, he wonders if it might be advisable to make the cooks work in a pit, to prevent them from stealing. Euclio now comes back from the market, having bought nothing but a little incense and flowers for the household god. Suddenly he hears the cook calling for a pot (aula), and is alarmed in case they may be stealing his pot of gold. The other cook, Anthrax, wishing to borrow a pan comes out of Megadorus's house, but is alarmed to hear shouting and noise from Euclio's, so goes back inside.

- Act 3.1 (406-414): mixed metres (ia-tr, an) (9 lines)

Congrio runs out of Euclio's house in distress, complaining that he has been beaten black and blue.

- Act 3.1 (cont.) (415–446): versus reiziani (32 lines)

Euclio follows him outside and there is a furious argument. He goes inside again to check on his gold.

- Act 3.1 (cont.)–3.4 (447-474): trochaic septenarii (28 lines)

Euclio comes outside hiding the pot of gold under his cloak. He sends everyone in again. Left alone, he recounts how he found a cock scratching the ground near his treasure, and he had knocked off its head with his stick.

=== Euclio hides the gold ===
- Act 3.5–3.6 (475-586): iambic senarii (112 lines)

Megadorus approaches from the forum, talking to himself: he says his friends universally approve of the match. It seems to him to be a good idea for rich men to marry poor girls, since wealthy brides always require lots of expenses. Euclio hears this speech with approval. But he chides Megadorus for filling the house with thieves, and complains that the lamb which was sent was too skinny. When Megadorus offers to send round some wine, Euclio says he won't drink any. When Megadorus has gone, Euclio says he will hide his pot of gold in the nearby temple of Faith.

- Act 4.1–4.4 (587-660): trochaic septenarii (74 lines)

A slave (the manuscripts name him "Strobilus" but he may be a different slave) of Lyconides (the young man who had raped Euclio's daughter) appears and says it is a slave's duty to support his master. His master, who is in love with the daughter, has sent him to keep watch. He hides behind the altar which is in the centre of the stage. Euclio comes out of the temple, saying a prayer that the goddess may protect his gold. The slave, overhearing him, decides to go into the temple to look for the gold. But suddenly Euclio, disturbed by an omen, rushes out, discovers the slave in the temple, drags him out and searches him, but finding nothing he orders the slave to go away.

=== Lyconides confesses to the rape ===
- Act 4.5–4.8 (661-712): iambic senarii (52 lines)

The slave hides again while Euclio goes into the temple to fetch the gold. When Euclio comes out, the slave overhears him saying that this time he is going to hide the gold in the grove of Silvanus outside the town. The slave runs off to get there before Euclio.

Megadorus's nephew Lyconides now appears with his mother, Eunomia. He has confessed to her about the rape, and he wishes her to speak to his uncle to abandon the wedding. At that moment they hear cries as the girl gives birth next door. Eunomia goes inside. Lyconides looks around for his slave but cannot find him. – The slave now returns, talking to himself: he has found the gold. He says he is going home to hide it.

- Act 4.9 (713-726): anapaestic (14 lines)

Immediately afterwards Euclio comes rushing up in a frenzy: he has found the pot missing. He asks the audience if they have seen the thief. He begins to lament miserably.

- Act 4.9 (727-730a): trochaic system (8 lines)

Lyconides now comes outside, and thinks that the reason for Euclio's distress is that he has found out about the baby. He is at a loss what to do.

- Act 4.10 (731-802): trochaic septenarii (72 lines)

Lyconides tells Euclio that he has a confession to make. At first Euclio mistakes him to mean that he has stolen the gold. But eventually Lyconides sets him right. He says Megadorus no longer wishes to marry the daughter, but he himself wishes to do so, having got her pregnant. Euclio goes inside to see if it is true, leaving Lyconides to wait.

=== Lyconides discovers his slave with the gold ===
- Act 4.10 (cont.) (803-807): iambic septenarii (5 lines)

Lyconides says he will wait to see if his slave turns up.

- Act 5.1 (808-818): trochaic septenarii (10 lines)

The slave enters, speaking to himself. He is saying he has found the gold. He sees Lyconides and says he will now ask him for his freedom.

- Act 5.1 (cont.) (819-832): mixed trochaic (14 lines)

Lyconides overhears him and demands that he reveals what it is he has found. The slave says it is Euclio's gold, and that he wants his freedom for it. But Lyconides says he must give it up and return it to Euclio. The slave now tries to deny that he has found any treasure. (The manuscript breaks off here.)

== The two slaves ==
Megadorus's slave who organises the wedding preparations in the first half of the play is called Strobilus (lines 264, 334, 351, 354); except that at 363 the heading in the manuscripts says "FITODICVS". The editor Leo, assuming this meant "Pythodicus", changed the name "Strobilus" to "Pythodicus" in all the places mentioned. However, it is now thought that FITODICVS is a mere copyist's error for STROBILVS.

The slave of Lyconides who plays a large role in the second half of the play is also called Strobilus in the manuscripts, both in the headings and in lines 697 and 804. Scholars have long debated whether this is the same slave as the Strobilus who appears in the first half of the play.

Some, including T. B. L. Webster and Eduard Fraenkel, have argued that they are the same slave. According to this view, the unmarried Megadorus, his widowed sister Eunomia, and his nephew Lyconides, all live in the same house next door to Euclio, and Strobilus is therefore the slave of both Megadorus and Lyconides. One argument in favour of this view is line 727, where Lyconides describes Megadorus's house as "our house" (aedis nostras), implying that he too lives in the house next door to Euclio.

Others, however, including Wallace Lindsay and Walter de Melo, believe that the second slave is a different slave, whose name was corrupted in the manuscripts. Among arguments supporting this view are that (a) Euclio does not seem to recognise either Lyconides or the slave, which is unlikely if they live next door; (b) the slave who zealously carries out Megadorus's orders in the first half, seems to be in charge of the household, but the other seems to be a private servant of Lyconides; (c) the second slave applies to Lyconides for his freedom, without reference to the head of the family Megadorus; (d) in line 145 Eunomia tells her brother "I'm coming to advise you on this" (ted id monitum advento) and in line 175, when she takes her leave, he says "farewell" (vale) to her as if she lives in a different house; (e) the two slaves seem to be of different characters, the one responsible and placed in charge of the preparations, and the second rascally, deceitful, and interested in personal gain.

== Key themes ==
The figure of the miser has been a stock character of comedy for centuries. Plautus does not spare his protagonist's various embarrassments caused by the vice, but he is relatively gentle in his satire. Euclio is eventually shown as basically a good-hearted man who has been only temporarily affected by greed for gold.

The play also ridicules the ancient bachelor Megadorus for his dream of marrying the nubile and far younger Phaedria. The silly business of preparing for the marriage provides much opportunity for satire on the laughable lust of an old man for a young woman, in a clever parallel to Euclio's lust for his gold. Again, Megadorus is eventually shown as sensible and kind-hearted enough to abandon his foolish dream.

Plautus' frequent theme of clever servants outwitting their supposed superiors finds its place in this play too. Not only does Lyconides' slave manage to filch Euclio's beloved gold, but also Euclio's housemaid Staphyla is shown as intelligent and kind in her attitude toward the unfortunately pregnant Phaedria.

== Adaptations ==
Another play, Querolus seu Aulularia, was at one time ascribed to Plautus but is now believed to be a late 4th-century Latin imitation. It provides a kind of sequel in which Euclio dies abroad and informs a parasite of the hiding place of his treasure, which the latter is to share with Euclio's son Querolus. In the 12th century, Vitalis of Blois adapted Querolus in his own version of Aulularia.

During the Renaissance there were a number of adaptations of the Aulularia. One of the earliest was Giovanni Battista Gelli's La Sporta (The Basket), which was published in Florence in 1543. A Croatian version by Marin Držić was titled Skup (The Miser, 1555) and set in Dubrovnik. In 1597 Ben Jonson adapted elements of the plot for his early comedy The Case is Altered. At about the same time it was also used by the Danish Hieronymus Justesen Ranch (1539–1607) as the basis for his play Karrig Nidding (The Stingy Miser).

The very successful Dutch play, Warenar, based on Aulularia, was written by Pieter Corneliszoon Hooft and Samuel Coster in 1617. In 1629, the German poet laureate Joannes Burmeister published a Neo-Latin adaptation, also called Aulularia, that reworked Plautus' comedy to a play featuring Achan and Rahab from the biblical Book of Joshua. Molière's French adaptation, L'Avare of 1668, was even more successful and thereafter served as the basis for dramatic imitations, rather than Plautus' work.

== Editions ==
- Brandenburg, Yanninck, ed. (2023). Aulularia sive Querolus. Berlin: De Gruyter. ISBN 9783111000336.

== Translations ==
- Ramón Emeterio Betances, 1863: Botijuela full text
- Edward Holdsworth Sugden, 1893: Aulularia full text
- Henry Thomas Riley, 1912: Aulularia full text
- Paul Nixon, 1916–38: Aulularia full text
- Sir Robert Allison, 1942
- Lionel Casson, 1963
- The Pot of Gold and Other Plays by Plautus, translated and introduced by E.F. Watling, Penguin Classics 1965 ISBN 0-14-044149-2
- Palmer Bovie, 1995
- Erich Segal, 1996
- de Melo, Wolfgang, ed. (2011). Plautus, Vol. I: Amphitryon; The Comedy of Asses; The Pot of Gold; The Two Bacchises; The Captives. Loeb Classical Library. ISBN 978-0674996533.
