= Jozef IJsewijn =

Belgian Latinist (1932–1998)

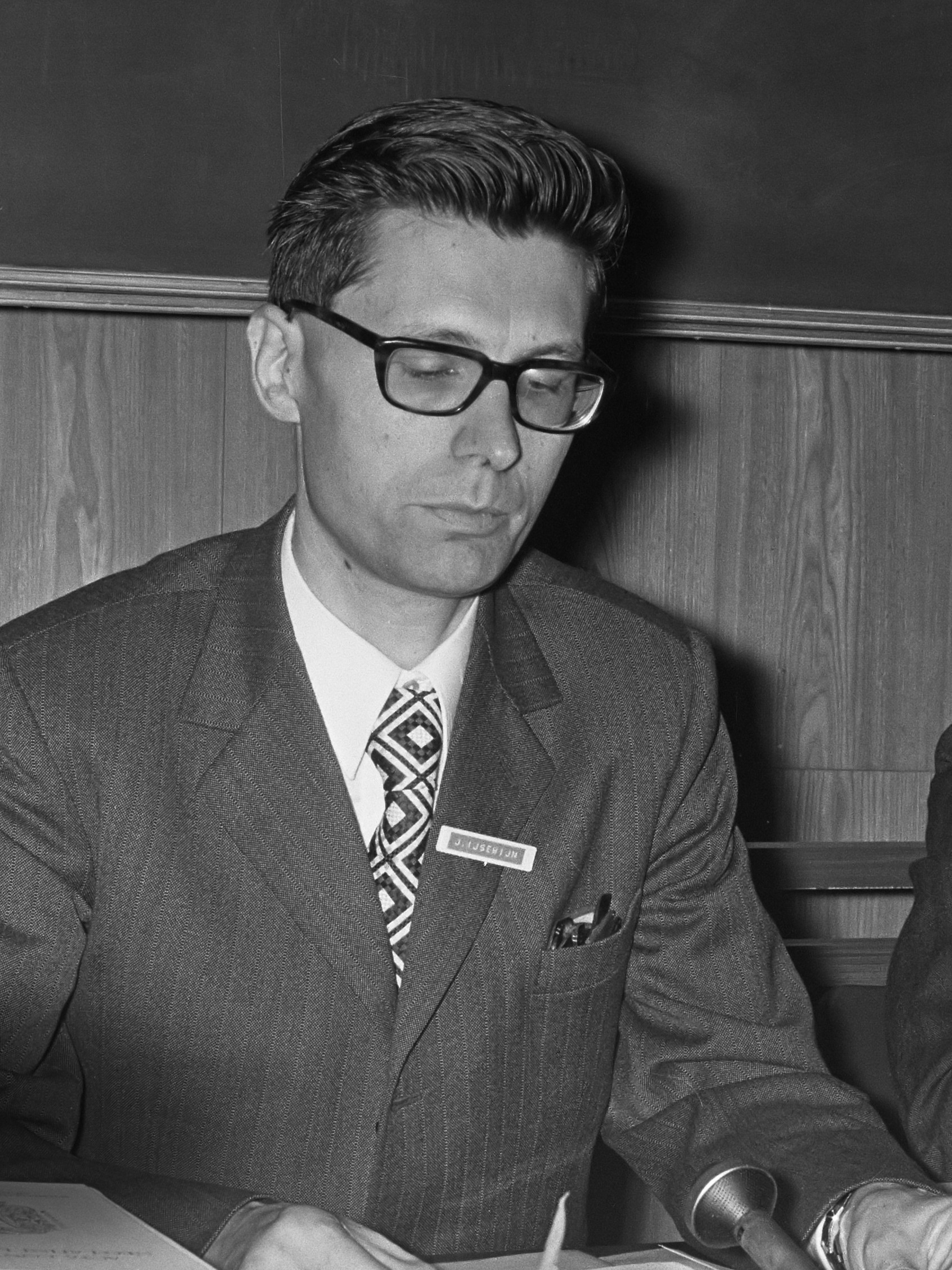
Jozef IJsewijn (1973)

Jozef A. M. K. IJsewijn (Zwijndrecht, 30 December 1932 – Leuven, 27 November 1998) was a Belgian Latinist. He studied classical philology at the Katholieke Universiteit Leuven, where he became a professor in 1967. An authority on Neo-Latin literature (Latin texts since the beginning of humanism in the 14th century), IJsewijn has been called "the founding father of modern neo-Latin studies". In 1980, he was awarded the Francqui Prize on Human Sciences. A collection of essays in his memory was published in 2000.

== Works ==
- De sacerdotibus sacerdotiisque Alexandri Magni et Lagidarum eponymis, 1961
- (ed. with G. Verbeke) The late middle ages and the dawn of humanism outside Italy; proceedings of the international conference, Louvain, May 11-13, 1970, 1972
- Companion to neo-Latin studies, 1977
- (ed. with Jaques Paquet) The universities in the late Middle Ages, 1978
- (ed.) Martini Dorpii Naldiceni orationes IV: cum apologia et litteris adnexis by Maarten van Dorp, 1986
- (tr. and ed. with Barbara Lawatsch-Boomgaarden) Voyage to Maryland (1633) = Relatio itineris in Marilandiam by Andrew White, 1995.
