= Pietro Candido Decembrio =

Italian humanist and author (1399–1477)

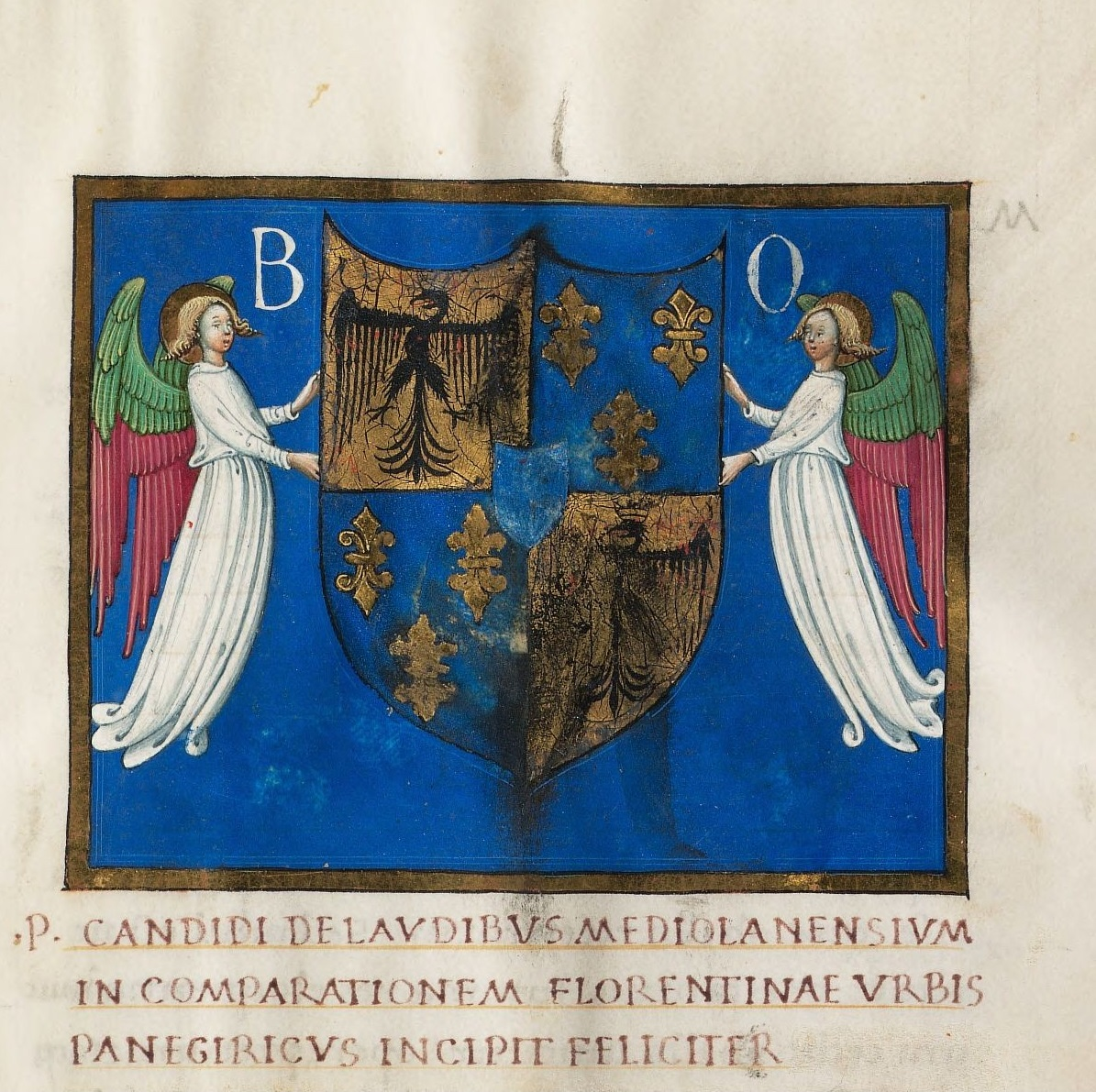
Opuscula manuscript by Pietro Candido Decembrio, circa 1460–1465

Pietro (also known as Pier and Piero) Candido Decembrio (in Latin, Petrus Candidus Decembrius) (1399–1477) was an Italian humanist and author of the Renaissance, and one of those involved in the rediscovery of ancient literature.

== Life ==
The son of the humanist Uberto Decembrio, Piero Candido Decembrio was born in Pavia, and named after his father's employer Peter of Candia. He was a pupil of his father's friend and teacher Manuel Chrysoloras in Florence. In 1419 he became secretary to Filippo Maria Visconti, Duke of Milan, and served in this post for nearly thirty years, continuing as secretary of the Ambrosian Republic after the Duke's death. When Francesco Sforza came to power in the city, Decembrio lost his position. He then found work in the chancery of Pope Nicholas V, but with several other humanists, he left after the accession of Pope Callixtus III and travelled instead to the Neapolitan court of Alfonso the Great of Aragon. After Alfonso's death in 1458 he returned to Rome as secretary to Pius II and then to Milan in 1460. In 1466 he was granted a pension by the Duke of Ferarra. In 1477 he died in Milan and is buried in the Basilica of Sant'Ambrogio.

He produced a Latin version of Plato's Republic and attempted a continuation of Virgil's Aeneid. His grave lists 127 works.

== See also ==
- Decembrio - family of scholars
