= Hermann Schotten =

German classicist and humanist author (1503–1546)

- Born: 1503; Hesse, Holy Roman Empire
- Died: 1546 (aged 42–43); Cologne, Hesse, Holy Roman Empire
- Other names: Hermann Schottenius, Hermannus Schottenius Hessus, Hermann Ortman
- Occupations: teacher, classicist, humanist author

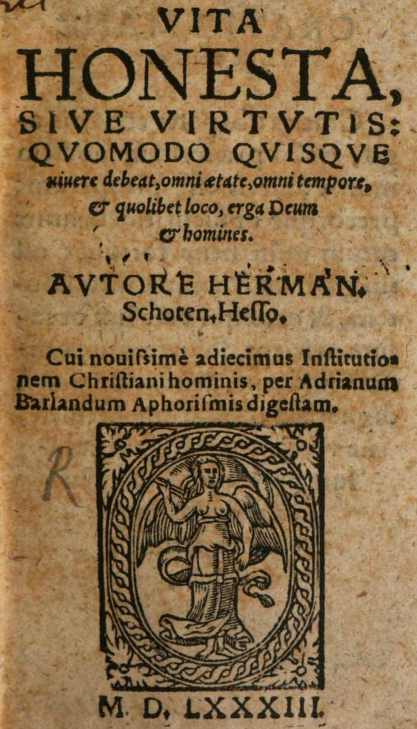
Title page of Hermann Schotten's book Vita Honesta Sive Vertutis, 1583

Hermann Schotten (Latin: Hermann Schottenius) (Note: Schotten's Latinized name is usually spelled with one "n" (Schottenius), but it is sometimes spelled with two "n"s (Schottennius). His real surname was probably Ortman, but he adopted a latinised toponymic surname, like many other contemporary German humanists.) (1503–1546) was a German classicist, teacher and humanist author.

== Life ==
Schotten was born in Hesse, Germany, in 1503, possibly in the town of Schotten. Hermann Schotten matriculated at the University of Cologne in 1517. He became a baccalaureus artium in 1519 and a magister artium in 1520, then in 1522 became a full voting member of the teaching body (bursa) of the Arts Faculty. The records of his career are scanty, but Schotten apparently paused his university academic career and spent somewhere from four to nine years employed as a schoolteacher.

In 1530, Schotten became a lector in the Bursa Laurentiana and then pursued an academic career until his death in 1546.

Schotten's didactic works achieved great popularity during his time, especially his 1525 book Confabulationes tironum litterariorum, which was a collection of Neo-Latin colloquies. For many years, this book of was a bestseller and an indispensable part of a classical education. It was reprinted more than 50 times during the 16th century. Over the years this book fell into disuse, but today, Schotten's works have resurfaced and are once again being used to teach correct use of classical Latin as a colloquial, conversational language.

Peter Macardie says that Schotten's Confabulationes were:

... written in admiring imitation of the colloquies of Erasmus. But Schotten had his own distinctive style, a natural ear for dialogue, and a sympathetic understanding of the schoolboy world; as a result he produced one of the liveliest pedagogical works of the [16th] century, and one which is also a vivid and valuable cultural document of life in the early modern metropolis of Cologne.

— Peter Macardie, Confabulations. Cologne Life and Humanism (2007)

== Works ==
Schotten is best known for his collection of 123 Colloquia and 33 Convivia. However, Schotten also wrote two Latin-language dramas.

- 1525: Confabulationes tironum litterariorum (Dialogues for the Lower Forms of Grammar Schools), which was modeled on the Colloquies of Erasmus and similar classical colloquia by other humanist writers. Schotten's Confabulationes was used extensively in German secondary schools.
  - Reprinted 57 different times before the end of the 16th century
  - In some cases this work was published under the title Instructio prima puerorum per colloquia mutua.
  - Recent bilingual edition (2007) in Latin and English: Hermannus Schotennius Hessus. Confabulationes tironum litterariorum (Cologne, 1525). Ed. by Peter Macardle. Durham: Durham Modern Languages Series, 2007. ISBN 0-907310-68-0
- 1526 Convivia (Banquets)
  - Convivia is a colloquy focused on social etiquette and table manners within the context of 16th-century life. It contains guidelines for behavior during a meal, such as how to sit, handle cutlery, and engage in polite conversation. It reflects the "Civilizing Process" typical of Northern Humanism.
  - Added to later printings of the Confabulationes. It is also included in Macardle's 2007 bilingual Latin/English edition of Confabulationes.
- 1541: Vita honesta virtutis, a guide to good conduct and moral education. Published several times in Kraków, Poland, and elsewhere
  - Full title: Vita honesta sive virtutis: quomodo quisque vivere debeat, omni aetate, omni tempore, et quolibet loco, erga deum et homines (which means "An honest life or a life of virtue: How each should live, in every age, in every time, in any place, towards god and men")
- 1526: Ludus Martius sive bellicus (Martial or Warlike Game)
  - Deals with the German Peasants' War of 1524–1525.
  - Full title: Ludus Martius sive bellicus : continens simulachrum, originem, fabulam et finem dissidii, habiti inter Rusticos et Principes Germaniae Orientalis ; anno 1525 (which translates to "The Martial or Warlike Game, containing a representation, the origin, the story, and the end of the conflict held between the peasants and the princes of Eastern Germany in the year 1525.")
  - It was performed by Schottenius and his students during Shrovetide (Fastnacht) in 1526.
  - Over approximately 25 scenes, Schotten depicts Bellona, the goddess of war, persuading the poor and oppressed rural population to cast out the goddess of peace and demand a reduction of their burdens from the princes.
- 1527: Ludus imperatorius (The Imperial Game)
  - Full title: Ludus imperatorius, continens umbraticam imaginem horum temporum, regnante divo Carolo V. illiusque Caesaris divinas victorias, imperii felicem exitum et laudem (which translates to "The Imperial Game, containing a shadowy image of these times, during the reign of the divine Charles V and that Emperor's divine victories, the happy outcome of the empire, and praise.")
  - The play is a political and allegorical drama designed to celebrate the power of the Holy Roman Emperor, Charles V, as the divinely appointed protector of European unity and the Christian faith.
  - The play opens with a prologue by the Imperial Eagle, followed by a gathering of devils.
  - Schotten's earlier drama, Ludus Martius, was appended to this edition.
- 1525: Ludus grammaticus (The Grammatical Game)
  - Full title: Ludus grammaticus latinae Linguae tramitem ostendens (which translates to "The grammatical game, showing the way of the Latin language.")
- 1529: Centuria epistolarum proverbialium (One Hundred Letters Based on Proverbs)
  - A manual for students, containing short, model letters written in Latin, using common proverbs, adages, or idiomatic expressions. Schotten translated popular German sayings into polished "Erasmian" Latin.
- 1535: Colloquia Philosophica (Philosophical Dialogues)
  - Full title: Colloquia Philosophica & consolatoria, ac exhortatoria, vtriusque fortunae ferendae modum docetia, iuxta Senecae & Francisci Petrarche cosilia, ne inexperta rerum adolescetia temere sapiat, neve in prosperis plus aequo gestiat, atque in aduersis aim no despondeat (which translates to "Philosophical Colloquies: both consolatory and exhortatory, teaching the manner of enduring both forms of fortune [good and bad], according to the counsels of Seneca and Franciscus Petrarcha; so that inexperienced youth may not behave rashly, nor exult more than is right in prosperity, nor lose heart in adversity")
  - A series of dialogues describing Stoic moral philosophy.
- 1525: Meta Studii literarii (The Goal of Literary Study)
  - Full title: Meta Studii literarii [e]t quomodo in eam sint ducenda omnium scientiarum genera, necnon cur sit inuentus labor literarius : Et quantum toto coelo, nunc aberrent hij, qui a literis se abdicant (which translates to "The Goal of Literary Study: and how all kinds of sciences should be directed toward it, as well as why literary labor was invented; and how far they wander from the truth—by the whole width of the sky—who now abandon themselves from letters.")
  - A pedagogical and philosophical defense of new Humanist education, versus traditional medieval "scholastic" methods. Schotten argues that the ultimate goal of all intellectual pursuits is rooted in "Literae," the study of classical literature and grammar. Various fields of knowledge should not be studied in isolation but should be led toward a unified literary foundation to create a well-rounded, ethical individual.
