= Colloquium =

Colloquium may refer to:

- An academic seminar usually led by a different lecturer and on a different topic at each meeting or similarly to a tutorial led by students as is the case in Norway.
- A form of testing and assessing students' knowledge in the education system, mainly in universities.
- The Parliament of Scotland, called a "colloquium" in Latin records
- Any musical piece celebrating birth or distribution of good news, a hymn (antonyms: requiem, coronach)
- The part of a complaint for defamation in which the plaintiff avers that the defamatory remarks related to him or her
- (Classics) A set of scripted dialogues intended for practice in learning Latin or Ancient Greek, effectively a form of "language textbook."

== See also ==
- Symposium (disambiguation)
- Colloquy (disambiguation)
