= Music bursa =

Historical musical boarding school in the Grand Duchy of Lithuania

- Belarusian: Бурса музычная
- Type: Boarding school, Music school
- Purpose: Musical education, church choir service
- Location: Grand Duchy of Lithuania
- Affiliations: Jesuits (mostly)

A music bursa (Belarusian: бурса музычная, bursa muzychnaya) was a specific type of boarding school and dormitory attached to Jesuit collegiums and other religious institutions in the Grand Duchy of Lithuania during the 17th and 18th centuries. These institutions were established for poor students who could not afford to pay for their accommodation; their participation in church music and choirs served as a form of payment. Music bursas played a significant role in the development of the musical culture of the Grand Duchy of Lithuania.

== History and organization ==
Traditionally, the Society of Jesus was critical of the use of music and singing in church services. In the early period of their activity in the Grand Duchy of Lithuania, they only allowed the playing of existing organs. However, under pressure from the faithful, the Jesuits agreed to a wider introduction of music in their churches. This was permitted by the Order's authorities in Rome on the condition that spiritual chants be performed only by lay student youth. This duty was assigned to music bursas, which also organized orchestras.

The students living in these bursas, known as bursaks, sang in churches, played during ecclesiastical, school, and public celebrations, and accompanied theatrical performances staged by the collegium students. In some cases, performances by bursaks were allowed in other churches and at noble courts.

Among the bursaks were also those who had already completed their course of study at the collegium but remained to teach singing and music to current students. The music bursa was headed by a regent (prefect), who was assisted by a senior bursak. The term of study in the bursa was usually three years, after which senior bursaks spent another three years passing their knowledge to younger students. Some graduates remained as students in the music bursa and received payment for their work. The number of students in a music bursa usually did not exceed ten.

== Notable music bursas ==
Music bursas were established at various Jesuit collegiums and other religious centers across the Grand Duchy:

- Polotsk Jesuit Collegium – existed since 1597.
- Nesvizh Jesuit Collegium – since approx. 1610.
- Brest-Litovsk Jesuit Collegium – since approx. 1630.
- Pinsk Jesuit Collegium – since approx. 1645.
- Kaunas Jesuit Collegium – founded in 1650 by P. Szukszt.
- Vilnius Academy – founded in 1651 by Dean Zhabinski.
- Vitebsk Jesuit Collegium – since 1673.
- Zhyrovichy Monastery – also had a known music bursa.

== See also ==
- Bursa (education)
- Collegium (Jesuit)
- Music of Belarus

== Bibliography ==
- "Бурса музычная". Вялікае княства Літоўскае: Энцыклапедыя [Grand Duchy of Lithuania: Encyclopedia] (in Belarusian). Vol. 3. Мінск: Беларуская Энцыклапедыя. 2010. p. 696. ISBN 978-985-11-0487-7.
- Дадзіёмава, В. У. (1992). Музыкальная культура городов Белоруссии в XVIII веке [Musical Culture of Cities of Belorussia in the 18th Century] (in Russian). Мінск: Навука і тэхніка.
- Ліхач, Т. (1995). Музычныя бурсы езуітаў на Беларусі [Jesuit Music Bursas in Belarus]. Мастацтва (in Belarusian) (6).
- Дадзіёмава, В. У. (1995). З гісторыі музычнай бурсы пры Віцебскім езуіцкім калегіуме [From the History of the Music Bursa at the Vitebsk Jesuit Collegium]. Віцебскі сшытак (in Belarusian) (1).
