= Jesuit College in Brest-Litovsk =

Historical Jesuit educational institution in Brest-Litovsk

Brest-Litovsk Jesuit Collegium
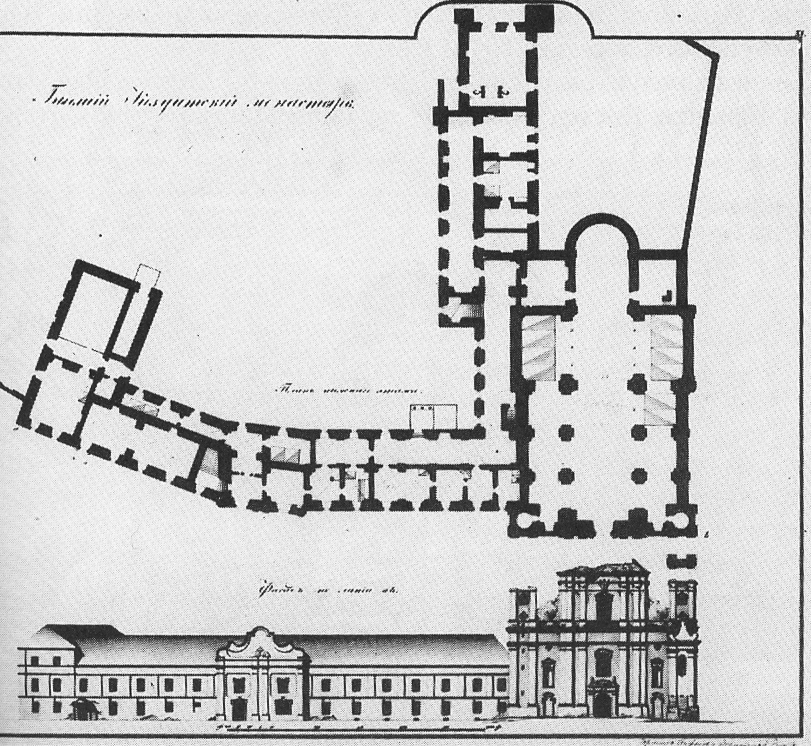
- Plan and main facade of the Jesuit church and collegium in Brest. Survey drawings from 1833.
- Brest-Litovsk; Grand Duchy of Lithuania

Information
- Type: Jesuit collegium
- Religious affiliation: Roman Catholic (Jesuits)
- Established: 1629
- Closed: 1773 (order suppressed)

The Jesuit College in Brest-Litovsk (Belarusian: Берасцейскі езуіцкі калегіум) was an educational institution of the Society of Jesus that operated in the 17th and 18th centuries in Brest-Litovsk (now Brest, Belarus). It functioned as a secondary educational institution of the classical type.

== History ==
At the invitation of the Bishop of Lutsk Paweł Wołucki, the Jesuits began missionary activities in Brest in 1616. In 1629, the Brest Collegium was founded. In 1620, the Voivode of Brest-Litovsk Andrzej Wołłowicz donated the Adamkava manor to the Jesuits, which became their residence. The Vilna Voivode and Starosta of Magiliou Lew Sapieha donated the Dzieravna manor with the villages of Moĺtki and Mianiaviež (Brest District), and in 1650, the manor and village of Panikvy (Kamieniec District). In 1669, King Michael Korybut Wiśniowiecki granted the Jesuits the village of Ploska and lands in Pryluki (Brest District).

Throughout the 17th and 18th centuries, the Jesuit order acquired new lands with villages (Slaŭki, Studzilovičy, Liaskavičy, etc., in the Brest Povet), lending money secured by estates, turning into a major usurer and organizer of industrial exploitation; it possessed a library and a pharmacy (from 1694). A school existed at the residence. Around 1630, a music bursa (dormitory/school) was in operation. In 1633, the residence was transformed into a collegium. From the early 18th century until 1755, the construction of a new building for the collegium was underway.

The curriculum of the Brest Jesuit Collegium was typical for Jesuit schools. It taught the "liberal arts" (septem artes liberales), theology, Latin, and Greek. As an educational institution, it contributed to strengthening the position of the Catholic Church and establishing a European education system in the Brest region. From 1634, only teachers holding the title of professor taught at the collegium. In the 1772/1773 academic year, out of 28 teachers, 17 were priests, 3 were primary school teachers, and 8 were monks. From 1696 to the 1760s, a school theater operated at the collegium. The library, which contained about 2,000 volumes, held books in Latin, German, French, and other languages. In 1731, a significant collection of 300 volumes was donated by Jan Fryderyk Sapieha.

The buildings of the collegium were located on the territory of the modern Brest Fortress and have not survived.

== Notable alumni ==
- Kazimierz Łyszczyński (1634–1689) – Belarusian thinker, atheist, educator, and public figure.
- Jan Fryderyk Sapieha (1680–1751) – Grand Duchy of Lithuania statesman.
- Julian Ursyn Niemcewicz (1757–1841) – Polish writer, political activist, historian.

== Bibliography ==
- "Брэсцкі езуіцкі калегіум". Беларуская энцыклапедыя: У 18 т. [Belarusian Encyclopedia: In 18 Vol.] (in Belarusian). Vol. 3. Мінск: БелЭн. 1996. ISBN 985-11-0068-4.
- "Брэсцкі езуіцкі калегіум". Энцыклапедыя гісторыі Беларусі [Encyclopedia of the History of Belarus] (in Belarusian). Vol. 2. Мінск: БелЭн. 1994. ISBN 5-85700-142-0.
- "Берасцейскі езуіцкі калегіум". Вялікае княства Літоўскае: Энцыклапедыя [Grand Duchy of Lithuania: Encyclopedia] (in Belarusian). Vol. 1. Мінск: БелЭн. 2005. ISBN 985-11-0314-4.
- Ярашэвіч, А. А. (2000). Каталіцкія храмы Беларусі: Энцыкл. даведнік [Catholic Churches of Belarus: Encyclopedic Reference] (in Belarusian). Мінск: БелЭн. ISBN 985-11-0188-5.
