= Neo-Latin =

Form of the Latin language used from the 14th century to present

- Neolatina
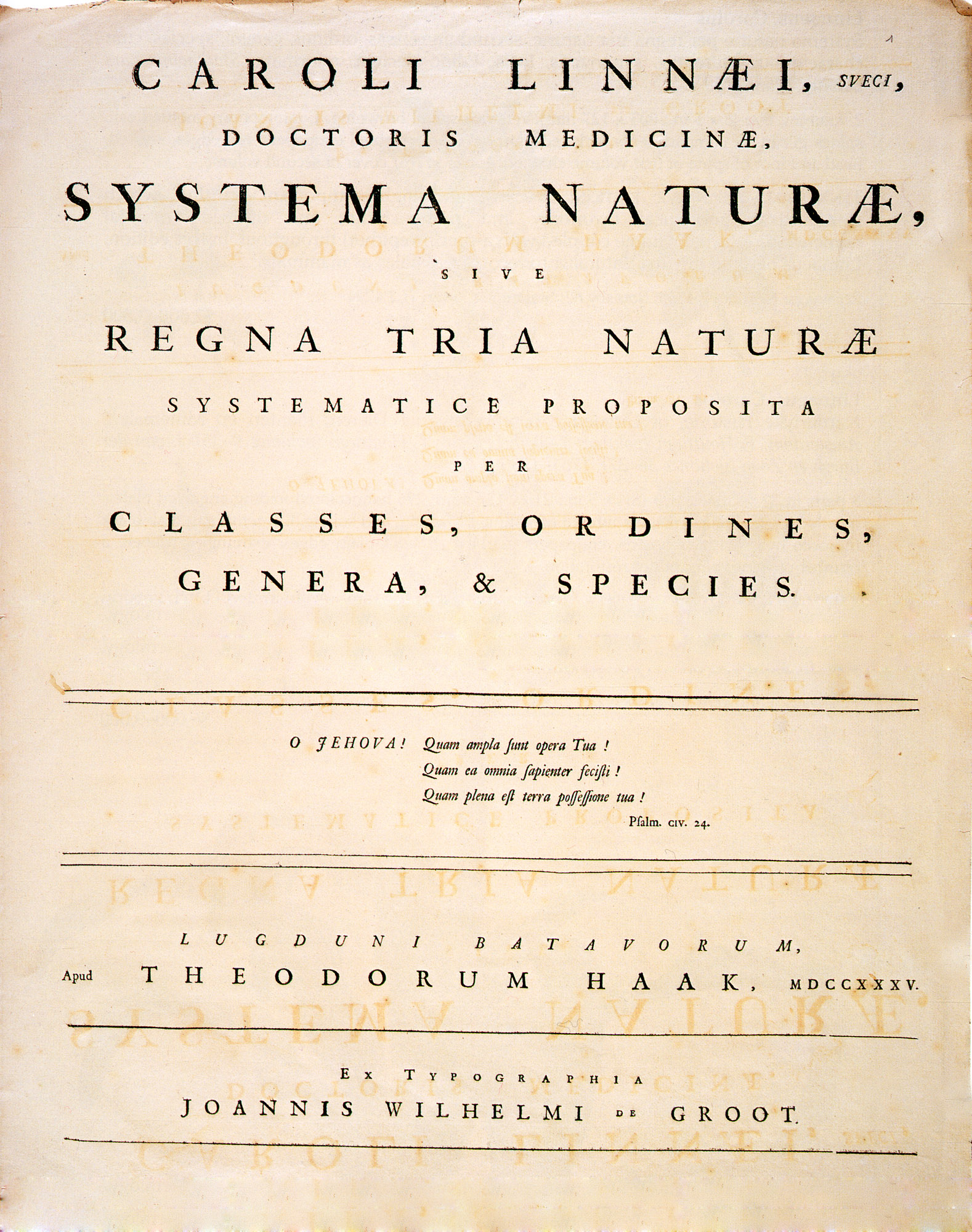
- Linnaeus, 1st edition of Systema Naturae is a New Latin text.
- Region: Western countries
- Era: From Petrarch and Renaissance Latin in the 14th century; height 1500–1700; current usage Contemporary Latin
- Language family: Indo-European: Italic; Latino-Faliscan; Latin; Neo-Latin
- Early forms: Old Latin: Classical Latin; Late Latin; Medieval Latin; Renaissance Latin
- Writing system: Latin alphabet

Language codes
- ISO 639-1: la
- ISO 639-2: lat
- ISO 639-3: lat

Neo-Latin (also known as New Latin (Note: The term "New Latin" can be found in scientific lexicons, for instance Brown 1954, p. 6) and Modern Latin) is the style of written Latin used in original literary, scholarly, and scientific works, first in Italy during the Italian Renaissance of the fourteenth and fifteenth centuries, and then across northern Europe after about 1500, as a key feature of the humanist movement. Through comparison with Latin of the Classical period, scholars from Petrarch onwards promoted a standard of Latin closer to that of the ancient Romans, especially in grammar, style, and spelling. The term Neo-Latin was however coined much later, probably in Germany in the late eighteenth century, as Neulatein, spreading to French and other languages in the nineteenth century. Medieval Latin had diverged quite substantially from the classical standard and saw notable regional variation and influence from vernacular languages. Neo-Latin attempts to return to the ideal of Golden Latinity in line with the Humanist slogan ad fontes.

The new style of Latin was adopted throughout Europe, first through the spread of urban education in Italy, and then the rise of the printing press and of early modern schooling. Latin was learnt as a spoken language as well as written, as the vehicle of schooling and University education, while vernacular languages were still infrequently used in such settings. As such, Latin dominated early publishing, and made up a significant portion of printed works until the early nineteenth century.

In Neo-Latin's most productive phase, it dominated science, philosophy, law, and theology, and it was important for history, literature, plays, and poetry. Classical styles of writing, including approaches to rhetoric, poetical metres, and theatrical structures, were revived and applied to contemporary subject matter. It was a pan-European language for the dissemination of knowledge and communication between people with different vernaculars in the Republic of Letters (Res Publica Litterarum). Even as Latin receded in importance after 1650, it remained vital for international communication of works, many of which were popularised in Latin translation, rather than as vernacular originals. This in large part explains the continued use of Latin in Scandinavian countries and Russia – places that had never belonged to the Roman Empire – to disseminate knowledge until the early nineteenth century.

Neo-Latin includes extensive new word formation. Modern scholarly and technical nomenclature, such as in zoological and botanical taxonomy and international scientific vocabulary, draws extensively from this newly minted vocabulary, often in the form of classical or neoclassical compounds. Large parts of this new Latin vocabulary have seeped into English, French and several Germanic languages, particularly through Neo-Latin. (Note: In the case of English, about 60% of the lexicon can trace its origin to Latin, thus many English speakers can recognize Neo-Latin terms with relative ease as cognates are quite common.)

In the eighteenth century, Latin was increasingly being learnt as a written and read language, with less emphasis on oral fluency. While it still dominated education, its position alongside Greek was increasingly attacked and began to erode. In the nineteenth century, education in Latin (and Greek) focused increasingly on reading and grammar, and mutated into the 'classics' as a topic, although it often still dominated the school curriculum, especially for students aiming for entry to university. Learning moved gradually away from poetry composition and other written skills; as a language, its use was increasingly passive outside of classical commentaries and other specialised texts.

Latin remained in active use in eastern Europe and Scandinavia for a longer period. In Poland, it was used as a vehicle of local government. This extended to those parts of Poland absorbed by Germany. Latin was used as a common tongue between parts of the Austrian Empire, particularly Hungary and Croatia, at least until the 1820s. Croatia maintained a Latin poetry tradition through the nineteenth century. Latin also remained the language of the Catholic Church and of oral debate at a high level in international conferences until the mid twentieth century.

Over time, and especially in its later phases after its practical value had severely declined, education that included strong emphasis on Latin and Greek became associated with elitism and as a deliberate class barrier for entry to educational institutions.

Post-classical Latin, including medieval, Renaissance and Neo-Latin, makes up the vast majority of extant Latin output, estimated as well over 99.99% of the totality. Given the size of output and importance of Latin, the lack of attention to it is surprising to many scholars. The trend is a long one, however, dating back to the late eighteenth and nineteenth centuries, as Neo-Latin texts became looked down on as non-classical. Reasons could include the rising belief during this period in the superiority of vernacular literatures, and the idea that only writing in one's first language could produce genuinely creative output, found in nationalism and Romanticism. More recently, the lack of trained Latinists has added to the barriers.

More academic attention has been given to Neo-Latin studies since 1970, and the role and influence of Latin output in this period has begun to be reassessed. Rather than being an adjunct to Classical Latin forms, or an isolated, derivative and now largely irrelevant cultural output, Neo-Latin literature is seen as a vital context for understanding the vernacular cultures in the periods when Latin was in widespread productive use. Additionally, classical reception studies have begun to assess the differing ways that Classical culture was understood in different nations and times.

== Extent and characteristics ==
=== Time period ===
Classicists use the term "Neo-Latin" to describe the Latin that developed in Renaissance Italy as a result of renewed interest in classical civilization in the 14th and 15th centuries. (Note: Particular academic studies may however refer to subsets of the time period. See Knight 2016.) Scientific nomenclatures sometimes prefer the term "New Latin", to show where their terms were coined in the same period.

Neo-Latin describes the use of the Latin language for any purpose, scientific or literary, during and after the Renaissance. The beginning of the period cannot be precisely identified. The spread of secular education, the acceptance of humanistic literary norms, and the wide availability of Latin texts following the invention of printing, mark the transition to a new era of scholarship at the end of the 15th century, but there was no simple, decisive break with medieval traditions. Rather, there was a process of change in education, a choice of literary and stylistic models, and a move away from medieval techniques of language formation and argumentation.

The end of the Neo-Latin period is likewise indeterminate, but Latin as a regular vehicle of communicating ideas became rare following the dissolution of the Holy Roman Empire and after the Congress of Vienna, where French replaced Latin as the language of diplomacy. By 1900, Latin survived primarily in international scientific vocabulary and taxonomy, or more actively, in the upper echelons of the Catholic Church. The term "Neo-Latin" came into use during the 1800s among linguists and scientists.

Neo-Latin can be said to be the current style of Latin writing, but different periods in its evolution can be seen. Neo-Latin writings were seen as less relevant and deserving of less attention than Classical Latin during the 1800s, as Classical models were asserted as the prime focus for study. Productive use of Latin for most purposes ended in the early 1800s.

=== Character of Neo-Latin writing ===
While Latin remained an actively used language, the process of emulating Classical models did not become complete. For instance, Catholic traditions preserved some features of medieval Latin, given the continued influence of some aspects of medieval theology. In secular texts, such as scientific, legal and philosophical works, neologisms continued to be needed, so while Neo-Latin authors might choose new formulations, they might also continue to use customary medieval forms, but in either case, could not aim for a purified Classical Latin vocabulary. Recent study tends to identify a style of Latin that was closer to Classical Latin in grammar, sometimes influenced by vernaculars in syntax especially in more everyday writing, but eclectic in choice of vocabulary and generation of new words.

Some authors including C. S. Lewis have criticised the Neo-Latin and classicising nature of humanistic Latin teaching for creating a dynamic for purification and ossification of Latin, and thus its decline from a more productive medieval background. Modern Neo-Latin scholars tend to reject this, as for instance word formation and even medieval uses continued; but some see a kernel of truth, in that the standards of Latin were set very high, making it hard to achieve the necessary confidence to use Latin. In any case, other factors are certainly at play, particularly the widening of education and its needs to address many more practical areas of knowledge, many of which were being written about for national audiences in the vernacular.

=== Corpus ===
The exact size of the Neo-Latin corpus is currently incalculable, but dwarfs that of Latin in all other periods combined. Material includes personal, unpublished, bureaucratic, educational, and academic output such as notes and theses. Given the extent of potential records, even regarding printed works, there is extensive basic work to be done in cataloguing what is available, as well as in digitisation and translation of important works.

=== Geographical spread ===
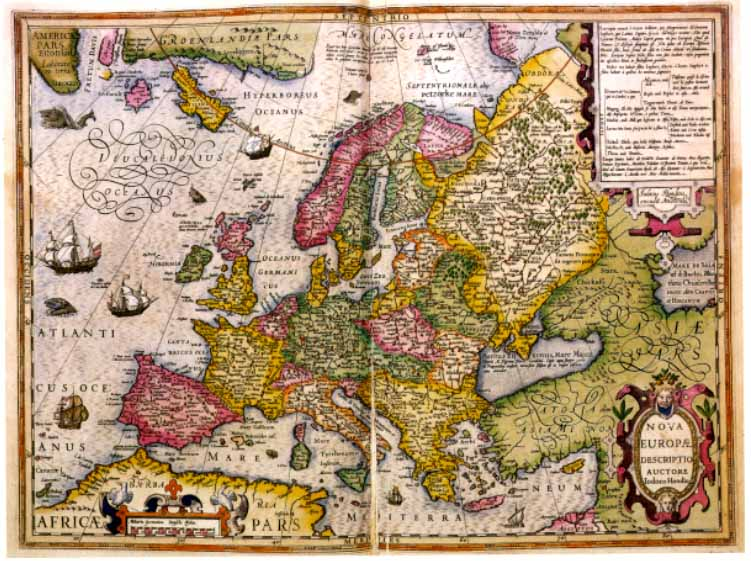
Jodocus Hondius' map Nova Europae Descriptio of 1619, printed during the peak of Neo-Latin's productive heights

Neo-Latin was, at least in its early days, an international language used throughout Catholic and Protestant Europe, as well as in the colonies of the major European powers. This area consisted of most of Europe, including Central Europe and Scandinavia; its southern border was the Mediterranean Sea, with the division more or less corresponding to the modern eastern borders of Finland, the Baltic states, Poland, Slovakia, Hungary and Croatia.

Russia's acquisition of Kyiv in the later 17th century introduced the study of Latin to Russia. Russia relied on Latin for some time as a vehicle to exchange scientific knowledge. Nevertheless, the use of Latin in Orthodox eastern Europe did not reach pervasive levels due to their strong cultural links to the cultural heritage of Ancient Greece and Byzantium, as well as Greek and Old Church Slavonic languages.

Latin was taught extensively in the US during the colonial period on the European model of Latin medium education, but the United States was among the first to allow this monopoly to recede. Both Latin and the Classics were very influential nevertheless, and supported an active Latin literature, especially in poetry.

Latin played a strong role in education and writing in early colonial Mexico, Brazil and in other parts of Catholic Americas. Catholicism also brought Latin to India, China and Japan.

== History ==
=== Beginnings ===
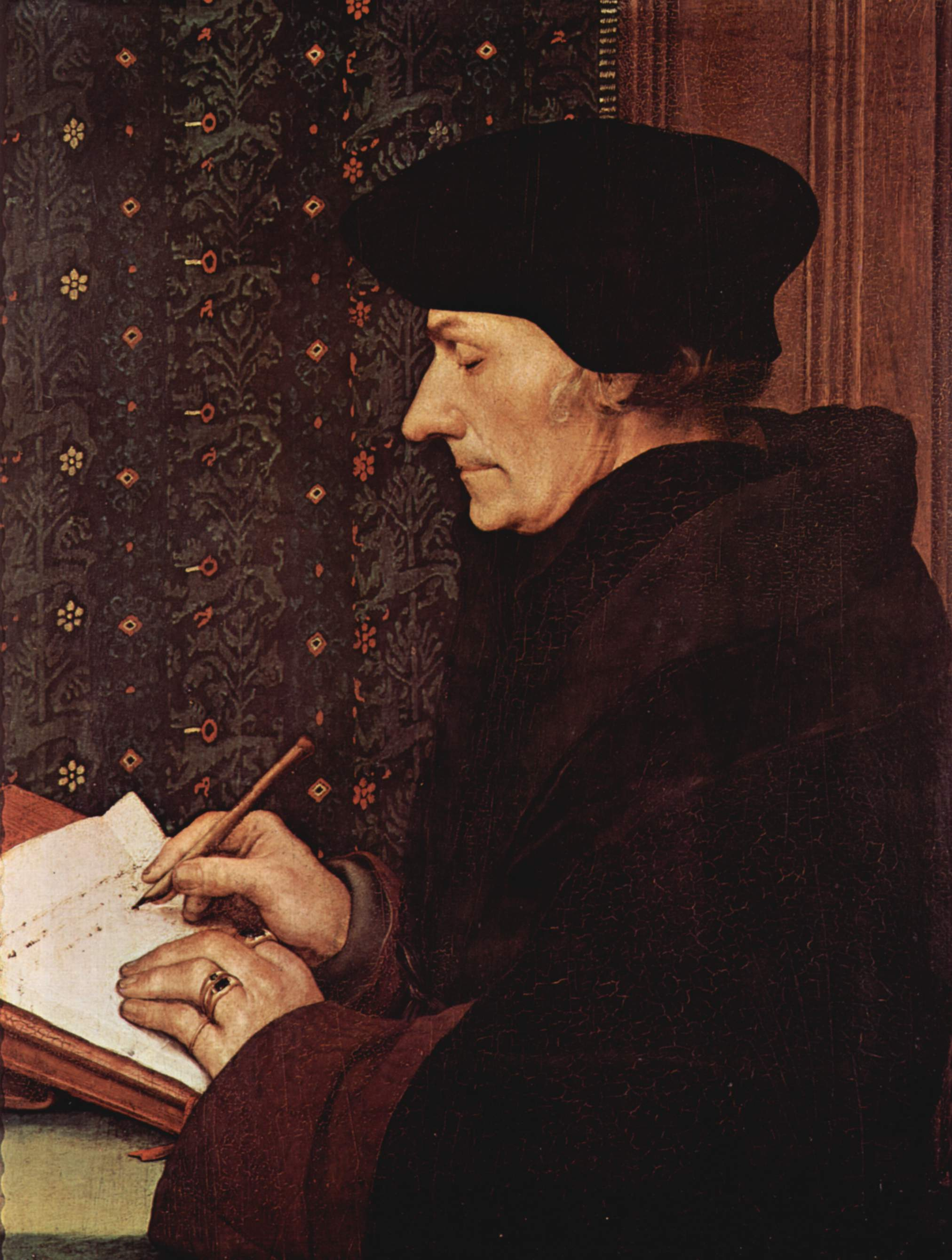
Erasmus stood at the forefront of the movement to reform Latin and learning.

Neo-Latin began in Italy with the rise of Renaissance Latin and humanist reform of Latin education, then brought to prominence in northern Europe by writers such as Erasmus, More, and Colet.

Medieval Latin had been the practical working language of the Roman Catholic Church, and was taught throughout Europe to clerics through the medieval university system. It was a flexible language, with many neologisms. Changes in grammatical practices regarding syntax and other elements such as conjunctions had become established.

The Renaissance reinforced the position of Latin as a spoken and written language by the scholarship by the Renaissance Humanists. Although scholarship initially focused on Ancient Greek texts, Petrarch and others began to change their understanding of good style and their own usage of Latin as they explored the texts of the Classical Latin world. Skills of textual criticism evolved to create much more accurate versions of extant texts through the fifteenth and sixteenth centuries, and some important texts were rediscovered. Comprehensive versions of author's works were published by Isaac Casaubon, Joseph Scaliger and others. Nevertheless, despite the careful work of Petrarch, Politian and others, first the demand for manuscripts, and then the rush to bring works into print, led to the circulation of inaccurate copies for several centuries following.

As the humanist reformers sought both to purify Latin grammar and style, and to make Latin applicable to concerns beyond the ecclesiastical, they began to create a body of Latin literature outside the bounds of the Church. Nevertheless, studies and criticism of Biblical translations were a particular and important focus of early Humanism, in Italy and beyond.

Prominent Neo-Latin writers who were admired for their style in this early period included Pontano, Petrarch, Salutati, Bruni, Ficino, Pico della Mirandola in Italy; the Spaniard Juan Luis Vives; and in northern Europe, the German Celtis.

In the late 1400s, some schools in the Low Countries were using the new Italian standards of Latin. Erasmus and other pupils promoted the new learning and Latin standards. The Low Countries established itself as a leading centre of humanism and Neo-Latin; Rotterdam and Leuven were especially well known for these intellectual currents.

Neo-Latin developed in advance of and in parallel with vernacular languages, but not necessarily in direct competition with them. Frequently the same people were codifying and promoting both Latin and vernacular languages, in a wider post-medieval process of linguistic standardisation. However, Latin was the first language that was available, fully formed, widely taught and used internationally across a wide variety of subjects. As such, it can be seen as the first "modern European language".

It should also be noted that for Italian reformers of written Latin, there was no clear divide between Italian and Latin; the latter was seen by Petrarch for example as an artificial and literary version of the spoken language. While Italian in this period also begins to be used as a separate written language, it was not always seen as wholly separate from Latin.

=== Height: 1500–1700 ===
The Protestant Reformation (1520–1580), though it removed Latin from the liturgies of the churches of Northern Europe, promoted the reform of the new secular Latin teaching.

The heyday of Neo-Latin was 1500–1700, when in the continuation of the Medieval Latin tradition, it served as the lingua franca of science, medicine, legal discourse, theology, education, and to some degree diplomacy in Europe. This coincided with the growth of printed literature; Latin dominated early publishing. Classic works such as Thomas More's Utopia were published. Other prominent writers of this period include Dutchmen Grotius and Secundus and Scotsman George Buchanan. Women, while rarely published, also wrote and composed poetry in Latin, Elizabeth Jane Weston being the most well known example.

==== Latin in school education, 1500–1700 ====
Throughout this period, Latin was a universal school subject, and indeed, the pre-eminent subject for elementary education in most of Europe and other places of the world that shared its culture. Schools were variously known as grammar schools in Britain, Latin schools in France, Germany, the Netherlands and colonial North America, and also Gymnasia in Germany and many other countries.

Latin was frequently the normal medium of education, both for teaching the Latin language, and for other subjects. Fluency in spoken Latin was an objective as well as the ability to read and write; evidence of this includes the emphasis on use of diacritics to maintain understanding of vowel quantity, which is important orally, and also on the use of colloquia for children's learning, which would help to equip the learner with spoken vocabulary for common topics, such as play and games, home work and describing travel. In short, Latin was taught as a "completely normal language", to be used as any other. colloquia would also contain moral education. At a higher level, Erasmus' Colloquia helped equip Latin speakers with urbane and polite phraseology, and means of discussing more philosophical topics.

One of the simpler sections from Erasmus' Colloquia Familiaria, explaining how to say thank you in Latin

Changes to Latin teaching varied by region. In Italy, with more urbanised schools and Universities, and wider curricula aimed at professions rather than just theology, Latin teaching evolved more gradually, and earlier, in order to speed up the learning of Latin. For instance, initial learning of grammar in a basic Latin word order followed the practice of medieval schools. In both medieval and Renaissance schools, practice in Latin written skills would then extend to prose style composition, as part of 'rhetoric'. In Italy, for prose for instance, a pupil would typically be asked to convert a passage in ordo naturalis to ordo artificialis, that is from a natural to stylised word order. Unlike medieval schools, however, Italian Renaissance methods focused on Classical models of Latin prose style, reviving texts from that period, such as Cicero's De Inventione or Quintilian's Institutio Oratoria.

Teaching of specific, gradually harder Latin authors and texts followed rhetorical practice and learning. In Italy, during the medieval period, at different periods, Classical and Christian authors competed for attention, but the Renaissance and Neo-Latin period saw a decisive move back to authors from the Classical period, and away from non-Classical 'minor' authors such as Boethius, whose language was simpler.

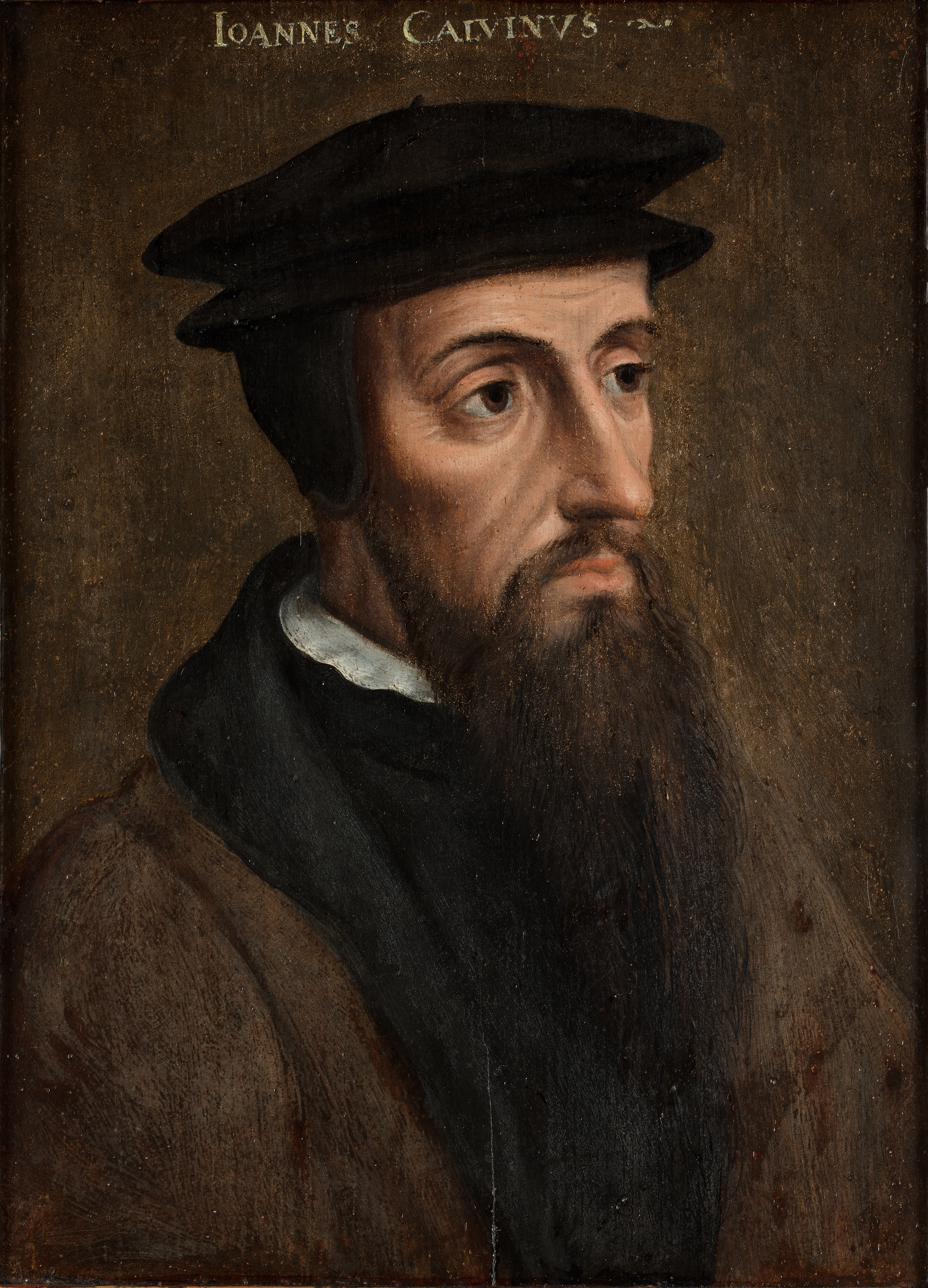
John Calvin was among the promoters of reform of Latin education, working with Corderius.

The changes to schooling in Northern Europe were more profound, as methods had not evolved as quickly. Adopting Italian innovations, changes to the teaching of grammar and rhetoric were promoted by reformers including Calvin, Melanchthon and Luther. Protestants needed Latin to promote and disseminate their ideas, so were heavily involved with the reform of Latin teaching. Among the most influential of these reformers was Calvin's Latin teacher and educational collaborator Corderius, whose bilingual colloquies were aimed at helping French-speaking children learn to speak Latin.

Among Latin schools, the rapid growth of Jesuit schools made them known for their dedication to high attainment in written and spoken Latin to educate future priests. This took place after the Catholic church affirmed their commitment to Latin in the liturgy and as a working language within the hierarchy at the Council of Trent in 1545–63. Jesuit schools were particularly well known for their production of Latin plays, exclusive use of spoken Latin and emphasis on classical written style.

However, the standards ultimately achieved by the whole school system were uneven. Not all students would acquire Latin to a high standard. Even in this period, an excessive focus on grammar and poor teaching methods were seen by reformers as a barrier to the acquisition of Latin. Comenius for instance was credited with significant attempts to make Latin more accessible through use of parallel Latin and native language texts, and more interesting through acquisition of vocabulary and the use of modern and more relevant information in texts. Others worried whether it was appropriate to put so much emphasis on abstract language skills such as Latin poetry composition. As time went on, the difficulties with Latin teaching began to lead to calls to move away from an emphasis on spoken Latin and the introduction of more native-language-medium teaching.

==== Latin in university education ====
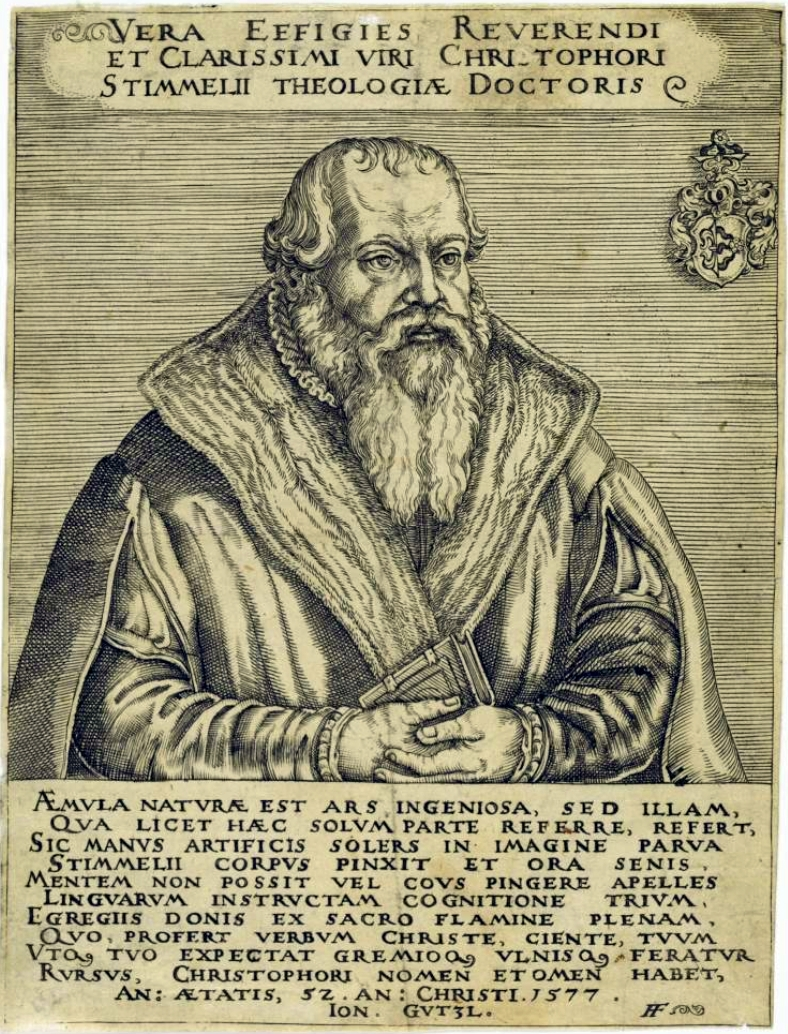
Christophorus Stimmelius, the German author of the first and highly successful comedy about student life

At the beginning of the Renaissance, universities in northern Europe were still dominated by theology and related topics, while Italian universities were teaching a broader range of courses relating to urban professions such as law and medicine. All universities required Latin proficiency, obtained in local grammar schools, to obtain admittance as a student. Throughout the period, Latin was the dominant language of university education, where rules were enforced against the use of vernacular languages. Lectures and debates took place in Latin, and writing was in Latin, across the curriculum.

Many universities hosted newly or recently-written Latin plays, which formed a significant body of literature before 1650. Plays included satires on student life, such as the play Studentes (Students), which went through many reprints.

Enforcement of Latin-only rules tended to decline especially after 1650.

==== Latin in academia, law, science and medicine ====
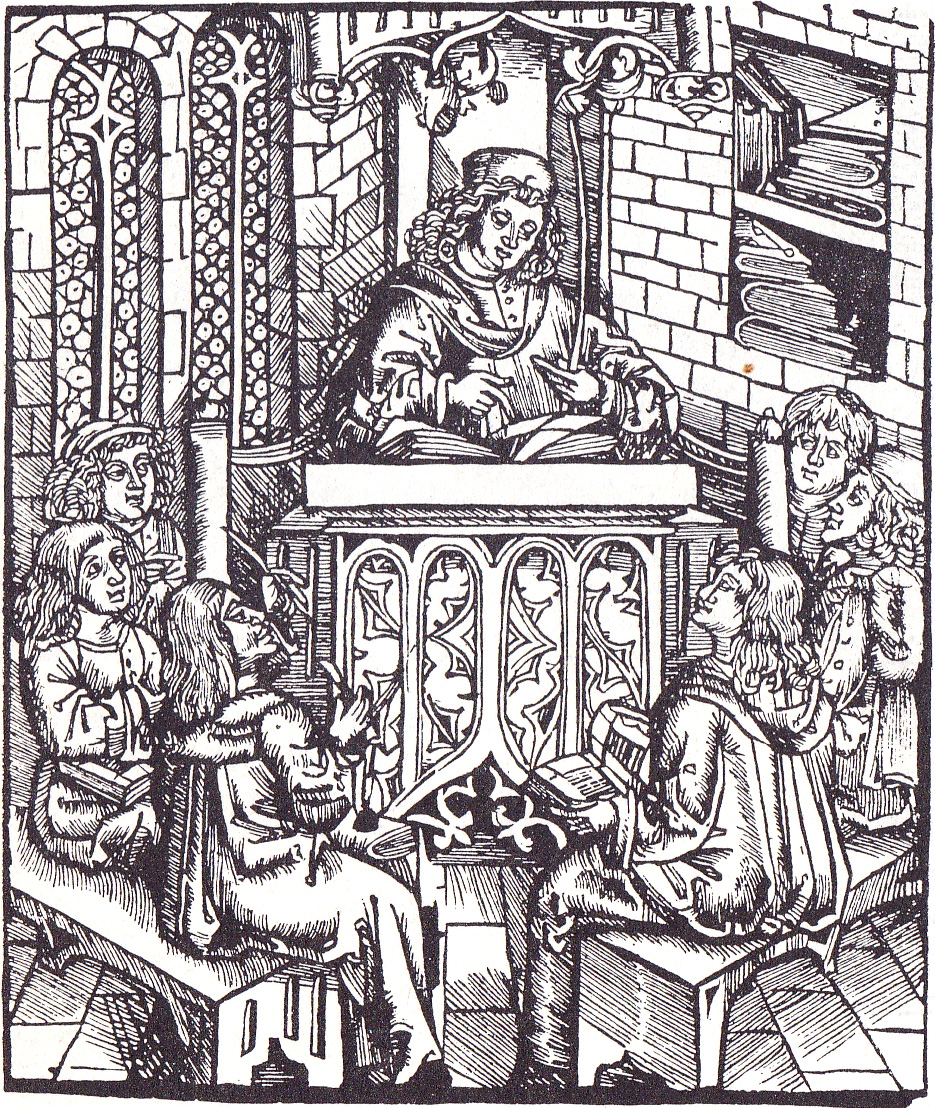
A fifteenth century lecture

Latin dominated topics of international academic and scientific interest, especially at the level of abstract thought addressed to other specialists. To begin with, knowledge was already transmitted through Latin and it maintained specialised vocabularies not found in vernacular languages. This did not preclude scientific writings also existing in vernaculars; for example Galileo, some of whose scientific writings were in Latin, while others were in Italian, the latter less academic and intended to reach a wider audience using the same ideas with more practical applications.

Over time, the use of Latin continued where international communication with specialist audiences was paramount. Later, where some of the discourse moved to French, English or German, translations into Latin would allow texts to cross language boundaries, while authors in countries with much smaller language populations or less known languages would tend to continue to compose in Latin.

Latin was of course the major language of Christian theology. Both Catholic and Protestant writers published in Latin. While Protestant writers would also write in vernaculars, Latin was important for the international dissemination of ideas.

Legal discourse, medicine, philosophy and sciences started from a strong Latin tradition, and continued as such. This began to change in the late seventeenth century, as philosophers and others began to write in their native language first, and translate into Latin for international audiences. Translations would tend to prioritise accuracy over style.

==== Latin and religious usage ====
Reading from John Calvin's Institutio Christianae Religionis written in Latin

The Catholic Church made exclusive use of Latin in the liturgy, resisting attempts even in the New World and China to diverge from it. As noted above, Jesuit schools fuelled a high standard of Latinity, and this was also supported by the growth of seminaries, as part of the Counter Reformation's attempts to revitalise Catholic institutions.

While in Protestant areas Latin was pushed out of the Church, this did not make Protestants hostile to Latin in education or universities. In fact, Latin remained a kind of bridge of communication across religious as well as linguistic divides in the Res Publica Litterarum.

One exception to the general rule of vernacular services in Protestant countries can be observed in the Anglican Church, where with the publication of the Book of Common Prayer of 1559, a Latin edition was published in 1560 for use in universities such as Oxford and the leading grammar and "public schools" (in the period, English schools established with charitable structures open to the general public; now a kind of private academy), where the liturgy was still permitted to be conducted in Latin.

==== Latin as a literary vehicle ====
In this period, it was common for poets and authors to write in Latin, either in place of or in addition to their native language. Latin was a language for "high art" in an "eternal language", that authors supposed might outlast contemporary vernacular writings. It allowed for an international readership that shared the same Classical and recent Latin cultural reference points.

The literature did not stand apart from vernaculars, as naturally allusions and the same reference points could flow across language boundaries. However, these dynamics have become less well understood, as academics and other readers are not as familiar with the Latin works of the period, sometimes resulting in simplistic notions of competition and replacement of Latin over time. The actual processes were more complicated and are now a focus of Neo-Latin studies. For instance, stylistic borrowings flowed from Latin to the Dutch vernacular, where models were lacking in the latter.

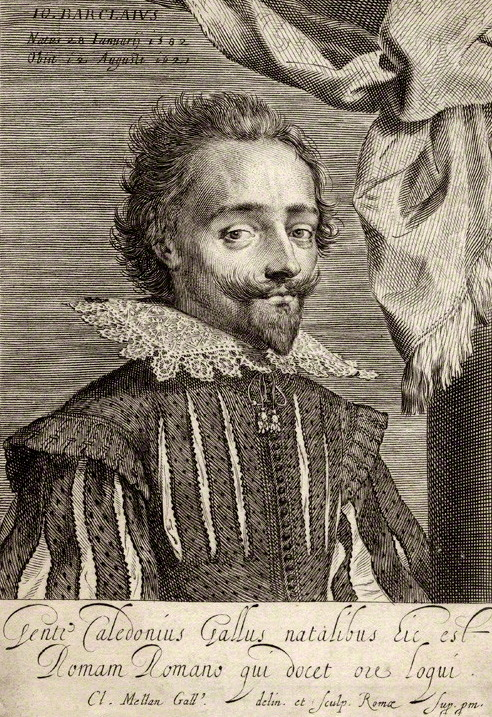
The Scottish poet John Barclay is among the internationally influential Latin writers of the seventeenth century.

Outputs included novels, poems, plays and occasional pieces, stretching across genres analogous to those found in vernacular writings of the period, such as tragedy, comedy, satire, history and political advice. Epistolary (letter) writing containing poems and prose, designed for publication rather than purely receipt, had Classical antecedents and often contained strong elements of self-promotion.

Some of these genres are harder for modern readers to evaluate; for instance many poems were written for specific occasions, such as appointments or institutional events. To modern audiences, such poetry appears contrived at its inception, so it is easy for the reader to assume a lack of pathos or skill.

At the time that many of these works were written, writers viewed their Latin output as a particularly refined and lofty activity, for the most educated audiences. Moreover, there was a hope of greater, international recognition, and that the works written in the "Eternal language" of Latin would outlast writings in the vernacular.

Some very influential works written in Latin are not always commonly remembered, despite their ground-breaking nature. For example, Argenis, by John Barclay was perhaps the first modern historical novel, and was popular across Europe.

Opinions vary about the achievements of this literary movement, and also the extent to which it reached its goal of being "classical" in style. Modern critics sometimes claim that the output of Neo-Latinists was largely derivative and imitative of Classical authors. Latin authors themselves could recognise the dangers of imitation caused by the long training they were given in ingesting compositional techniques of Classical writers, and could struggle against it. From another perspective, the "learned artifice" of Neo-Latin writing styles requires that we understand that "one of the most fundamental aspects of this artifice is imitation". Different approaches to imitation can be discerned, from attempting to adopt the style and manner of a specific author, especially of Cicero, through to syntheses of Latin from good authors, as suggested by Angelo Poliziano, taking elements from a range, to provide what Tunberg calls an "eclectic" style that was "new from the perspective of the whole creation". The use of Latin exclusively as used by Cicero was heavily satirised by Erasmus who proposed a more flexible approach to Latin as a medium.

Other critics have claimed that the expressive abilities of writers could not truly reach the same heights as in their native language; such concerns were sometimes expressed by contemporaries especially as time went on and vernaculars became more established. On the other hand, this criticism at the very least ignores the early age and intensity with which Latin was acquired.

==== Standards of written Latin ====
Not all Latin aspired to be high literature, and whether it did or not, standards varied. Standards were most classical and writing more fluid in France and Italy. In England, among typically unpublished scholarly works such as dissertations through the sixteenth century, written Latin improved in morphological accuracy, but sentence construction and idiom often reflected the vernacular. Similar patterns have been found in Sweden, where academic Latin tended to be very accurate in terms of morphology, but less Classical in its sentence patterns. In vocabulary and spelling, usage tend to be quite eclectic, using medieval forms and re-using Classical terms with modern meanings. In any case, it was accepted that technical terms would require neologisms.

There are occasional differences between Classical and Neo-Latin, which can sometimes be assumed to be mistakes of the authors. However, careful analysis of available grammars often shows these differences to be based on the understanding of the grammar rules at the time. For instance, many grammarians believed that all names of rivers were masculine, even those ending in -a.

Additionally, Neo-Latin authors tended to form new unattested words, such as abductor or fulminatrix, by using Classical rules. Helander says:

Apparently the authors did not care whether these words existed in the preserved Latin literature, as long as they were regularly formed. As a rule, their judgement was very sound, and in most cases we will not as readers realize that we are dealing with neologisms ... A large number of them were probably on the lips of the ancient Romans, although they have not survived in the texts preserved to us. One might wonder whether we are right in calling such words "neologisms".

The words used derived from a wider set of authors than just the "classical" period, especially among authors aiming at a higher level of style. Similarly, some Classical words which were uncommonly used were in much greater currency, such as adorea (glory).

The Latin used in scientific publications can be perceived as tending towards a simpler modern idiom, perhaps following the language patters of the writers' native language. Often it served a clear, less literary purpose, however, of providing an accurate international Latin text or translation.

==== Latin as a spoken language ====
An account of Queen Elizabeth I's response in Latin to a representation from the Polish ambassador, showing her rhetorical ability in spoken Latin

As a learnt language, levels of fluency would have varied. Discussions in specialised topics between specialists, or between educated people from different native language backgrounds would be preferred. Even among highly proficient Latin writers, sometimes spoken skills could be much lower, reflecting reticence for making mistakes in public, or simple lack of oral practice.

As noted below, an important feature of Latin in this period was that pronunciation tended to national or even local practice. This could make especially initial spoken communication difficult between Latinists from different backgrounds, English and French pronunciation being notably odd. In terms of status, the Italian pronunciation tended to have higher status and acceptability.

From some time in the seventeenth century, Latin oral skills began to decline. Complaints about standards of oral Latin can be increasingly found from this time onwards.

==== Latin as an official and diplomatic language ====
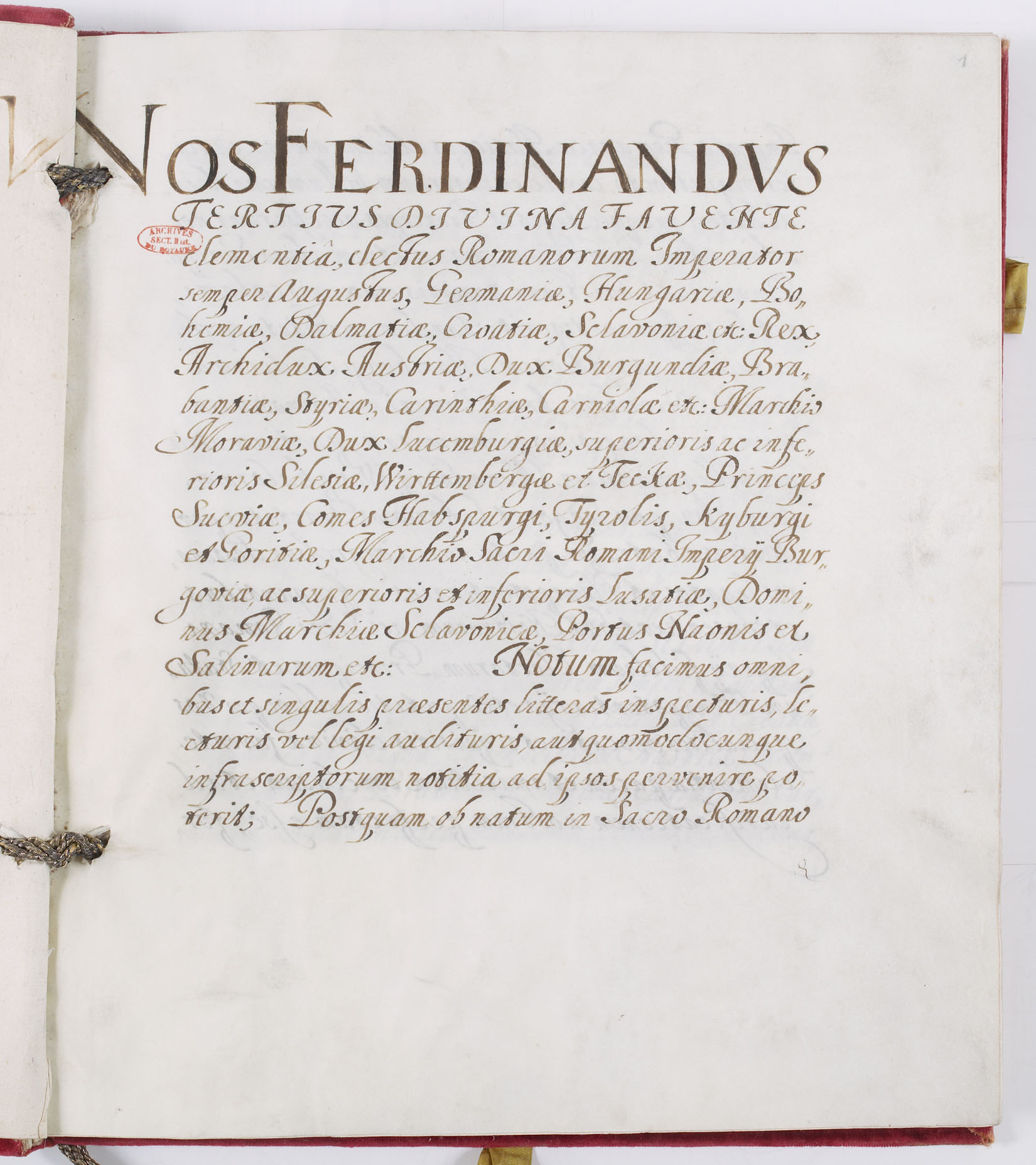
Treaty of Münster, part of the Peace of Westphalia, negotiated and written in Latin

Official and diplomatic settings are specific cases where the use of oral and conversational Latin would have taken place, in legal settings, in Parliaments, or between negotiators. The use of Latin would extend of course also to set speeches and texts such as treaties, but would also be the medium in which details would be discussed and problems resolved.

Latin was an official language of Poland, recognised and widely used. (Note: "Who only knows Latin can go across the whole Poland from one side to the other one just like he was at his own home, just like he was born there. So great happiness! I wish a traveler in England could travel without knowing any other language than Latin!" Daniel Defoe, 1728) Between the 9th and 18th centuries, commonly used in foreign relations and popular as a second language among some of the nobility.

Through most of the 17th century, Latin was also supreme as an international language of diplomatic correspondence, used in negotiations between nations and the writing of treaties, e.g. the peace treaties of Osnabrück and Münster (1648). As an auxiliary language to the local vernaculars, Latin appeared in a wide variety of documents. The need to read such documents continued to be important for diplomats.

The use of Latin in diplomatic contexts was especially important for smaller nations which maintained Latin for a variety of international purposes, who therefore pressed for it even as French established itself as a more common medium for diplomacy.

=== Eighteenth century decline ===
As languages like French, Italian, German, and English became more widely known, the use of an auxiliary language seemed less necessary. With greater readerships, many fields of literature became more national, and as vernaculars became better known, translation across language boundaries became more practical. In short, the utility of Latin in many areas decreased, and with it the output. Nevertheless, Latin continued to be important through the 1700s, especially in higher education, where it remained the dominant language of lectures. In particular fields, such as medicine, biology, law, and theology, Latin retained its grip more fully and for longer, and in some countries, particularly in Scandinavia and eastern Europe, Latin played a stronger role due to the small size of language communities or the need to work across such boundaries with a neutral, mutually acceptable medium.

In school education, Latin came under increasing attack as pupils needed time to study other more practical subjects, but it was not displaced from its dominant position, especially as a skill needed for university entry. Increasingly, even as Latin's relevance and pupils' attainment in it diminished, the language became associated with class boundaries, as a passport to a certain kind of education and social cachet, which were denied to those who were unable to dedicate the time to studying it.

==== Latin in school education in the 1700s ====
It became a widespread view in the 1700s that Latin and Ancient Greek lacked utility for all but a small minority. The use of Latin in education began to come under serious attack, as the need for education widened, while the relevance of Latin had diminished. However, these changes met resistance.

In the American colonies, calls for more practical education began to grow in the 1750s. In Poland, attempts to roll back the place of Latin were made in 1774, to make it a subject and to give up spoken Latin, but hit resistance and were withdrawn in 1778, when Latin was restored as a spoken medium. Attempts to introduce Italian and reduce Latin teaching in Piedmont in the 1790s also met with problems, not least due to the divergence between the local dialect and standard Italian; the changes were withdrawn, and children continued to learn and read and write in Latin before other languages.

In France, under the Ancien Regime, teaching remained largely focused on Latin until the Revolution. Although some moves were made to teach Latin grammar in French, and to learn to read and write in French first, these tended to be limited to urban centres and state-founded colleges such as those in Paris. Children learnt to read and write in Latin before French in most of the countryside until the 1790s. Use of spoken Latin in schools, however, reduced through the century, particularly from the 1750s. Gradually Latin in schools moved from a language taught for usage and production to written comprehension.

==== Latin in university education in the 1700s ====
A letter from Samuel Johnson to his former tutor thanking him for his help in his Oxford degree

At the academy, however, Latin retained its grip. At the Sorbonne, for instance, Latin remained the dominant language of tuition, with nearly all courses being delivered and examined in Latin. At Oxford, Latin-only rules remained in force, but there is clear evidence of a decline in spoken Latin standards, and it was no longer expected outside of classes. Elsewhere, courses in technical subjects tended to move towards the vernacular, while some were delivered in both Latin and vernaculars. Courses using Italian become more common from the 1750s, in subjects such as commerce and mathematics. In any case, even when courses were delivered in vernaculars, formal occasions such as inaugural lectures and ceremonies often remained in Latin.

==== Sciences and Academia ====
In the early part of the 1700s, Latin was still making a significant contribution to academic publishing, but was no longer dominant. For example, over 50% of the works published in Oxford between 1690 and 1710 were in Latin, and 31% of the total publications mentioned in the French Biliothèque raisonnée des ouvrages des savants de l'Europe between 1728 and 1740.

Immanuel Kant's early writing on science and philosophy included a short book in Latin, Monadologia: Physica Praenotanda.

Regional and subject differences counted for a lot in the choice of language and audience. An example of the transition towards the vernacular in England can be seen in Newton's writing career, which began in Neo-Latin and ended in English (e.g. Opticks, 1704). By contrast, while German philosopher Christian Wolff (1679–1754) popularized German as a language of scholarly instruction and research, and wrote some works in German, he continued to write primarily in Latin, so that his works could more easily reach an international audience (e.g., Philosophia moralis, 1750–1753).

Around 20% of academic periodicals were in Latin. Latin was particularly well-used in the German-speaking world, where the vernacular was not as well established. Erudition, theology, science and medicine were topics that were often addressed in Latin, such as by the long-running medical journal Miscellania curiosa medico-physica printed from 1670 until 1791. Some periodicals were general in nature, such as the Acta litteraria Bohemiae et Moraviae, from Prague, launched in 1744.

==== Literature and poetry ====
As the 18th century progressed, the extensive literature in Latin being produced at the beginning slowly contracted. Latin literature tended to be produced in countries where the vernaculars were by themselves still likely to attract small readerships. Some well known, influential and popular Latin books were produced, for instance Iter Subterraneum, a fantastical allegory in 1741.

==== Spoken Latin in the 1700s ====
As late as the 1720s, Latin was still used conversationally, and was serviceable as an international auxiliary language between people of different countries who had no other language in common. For instance, the Hanoverian king George I of Great Britain (reigned 1714–1727), who had no command of spoken English, communicated in Latin with his Prime Minister Robert Walpole. (Note: "Before I conclude the reign of George the First, one remarkable fact must not be omitted: As the king could not readily speak English, nor Sir Robert Walpole French, the minister was obliged to deliver his sentiments in Latin; and as neither could converse in that language with readiness and propriety, Walpole was frequently heard to say, that during the reign of the first George, he governed the kingdom by means of bad Latin." Coxe, William (1800). Memoirs of the Life and Administration of Sir Robert Walpole, Earl of Orford. London: Cadell and Davies. p. 465. "It was perhaps still more remarkable, and an instance unparalleled, that Sir Robert governed George the First in Latin, the King not speaking English, and his minister no German, nor even French. It was much talked of that Sir Robert, detecting one of the Hanoverian ministers in some trick or falsehood before the King's face, had the firmness to say to the German Mentiris impudissime!" Walpole, Horace (1842). The Letters of Horace Walpole, Earl of Orford. Philadelphia: Lea and Blanchard. p. 70.)

There is also no shortage of recorded complaints about poor standards of spoken Latin in universities and similar settings. While there is also praise, it is clear that oral skills were in decline. In academia, lectures began to include a vernacular summary at the end. In some contexts, such as Poland, it was simply accepted that oral Latin did not need to be perfected as a working administrative language. In other contexts, it led to pressure for the oral use of Latin to be abandoned.

Latin shifted towards increasingly being a written rather than spoken language. Evidence for this includes changes in the use of diacritics in texts, which ceased to be used.

==== Diplomacy and official status ====
A reading of a letter from Frederick the Great to A Polish magnate, assuring him of his good intentions towards Poland. Poland continued to use Latin for official purposes through the century, and after its partition and absorption into Prussia and Russia.

In the early 18th century, French (itself a Romance language, a language that evolved from Latin) replaced Latin as the dominant diplomatic language, due to the commanding presence in Europe of the France of Louis XIV. However, Latin continued to be preferred by some smaller nations such as Denmark and Sweden for some time.

Some of the last major international treaties to be written in Latin include the Treaty of Vienna in 1738 and the Treaty of Belgrade in 1739; after the War of the Austrian Succession (1740–48) international diplomacy was conducted predominantly in French. Some more minor trade treaties were written in Latin in 1737 and 1756 between Denmark and the Sublime Porte.

Latin retained a significant role in diplomatic correspondence beyond these dates. The Papacy, Holy Roman Empire, and Sweden continued to prefer Latin for communications through the century. In any case, due to the need to consult prior historic agreements, Latin remained an important skill for diplomats and was provided for in their training.

Prussia found Latin indispensable as late as 1798, for practical reasons in administering partitioned Poland from the 1770s onwards, where Latin remained the main administrative language. In central Europe, Latin retained an official status in Hungary and Croatia, as a neutral language.

=== Nineteenth century ===
By 1800, Latin publications were far outnumbered, and often outclassed, by writings in the modern languages. Latin literature lasted longest in very specific fields (e.g. botany and zoology) where it had acquired a technical character, and where a literature available only to a small number of learned individuals could remain viable. By the end of the 19th century, Latin in some instances functioned less as a language than as a code capable of concise and exact expression, as for instance in physicians' prescriptions, or in a botanist's description of a specimen. In other fields (e.g. anatomy or law) where Latin had been widely used, it survived in technical phrases and terminology. The perpetuation of Ecclesiastical Latin in the Catholic Church through the 20th century can be considered a special case of the technicalizing of Latin, and the narrowing of its use to an elite class of readers.

Hegel's Inaugural lecture for the Rectorship of the University of Berlin in 1815; some academic lectures and events were still delivered in Latin in the early 1800s.

==== End of administrative use ====
The Third Partition of Poland in 1795 ended the use of Latin as administrative language in Poland, as none of the partitioning powers used it for this purpose. However, in order to serve the needs of Poles, many Prussian schools taught lessons in Latin until the early 19th century. In Austria-Hungary, Latin remained the standard administrative language until 1844, when it was replaced with Hungarian over the objections of regional governments. Latin was retained as the language of the Hungarian Court Chancellery until 1846, and was used by some local governments until the Hungarian Revolution of 1848 which provided for regional autonomy.

==== Latin and Classical education ====
Despite the trends in the 1700s towards lessening emphasis on Latin, study of the language alongside Greek was given a significant boost after 1800 through a revival of humanist education, especially for elite education in France, Germany, England and elsewhere.

In this model, Latin suffered in status against Ancient Greek, which was seen as the better aesthetic example, but both languages were deemed necessary for a "Classical education". Latin was still generally a requirement for University education. Composition skills were still needed for submission of theses, for instance, in the early part of the century.

In England, study of the Classics became more intense at institutions like Eton, or Charterhouse. In grammar schools, however, study of Latin had declined, stopped or become tokenistic in the majority of cases at the point of the Taunton Commission's enquiry in 1864, a situation which it helped to reverse in the coming decades.

The renewed emphasis on the study of Classical Latin as the spoken language of the Romans of the 1st centuries BC and AD, was similar to that of the Humanists but based on broader linguistic, historical, and critical studies of Latin literature. It led to the exclusion of Neo-Latin literature from academic studies in schools and universities (except for advanced historical language studies); to the abandonment of Neo-Latin neologisms; and to an increasing interest in the reconstructed Classical pronunciation, which displaced the several regional pronunciations in Europe in the early 20th century.

Coincident with these changes in Latin instruction, and to some degree motivating them, came a concern about lack of Latin proficiency among students. Latin had already lost its privileged role as the core subject of elementary instruction; and as education spread to the middle and lower classes, it tended to be dropped altogether.

Latin and the Classics were under pressure from the need for much broader, general education for the wider population. It was clearly not useful or appropriate for everyone to attain high levels of Latin or Greek. Nevertheless, as a requirement for University entry, it formed a barrier to access against people from less privileged backgrounds; this was even seen as good thing. In this way, education in Latin became increasingly associated with a kind of elitism, associated with the education of English "gentlemen" or the French bourgeoisie, and forming a common bond of references within these social classes.

==== Latin and linguistics ====
As academic study of languages in Germany and elsewhere intensified, so did knowledge of Latin. This manifested itself in the proposal for restoring Classical pronunciation, but also in further refining knowledge of vowel quantity, use of grammatical constructions and the meaning of particular words. Study of non-standard Latin began. Overall, this intensified the purification, standardisation and academisation of Latin. In education, this led to an increasingly grammar based approach to learning in many countries, reinforcing its reputation for being difficult and abstruse.

==== Uses of Latin in the late 1800s ====
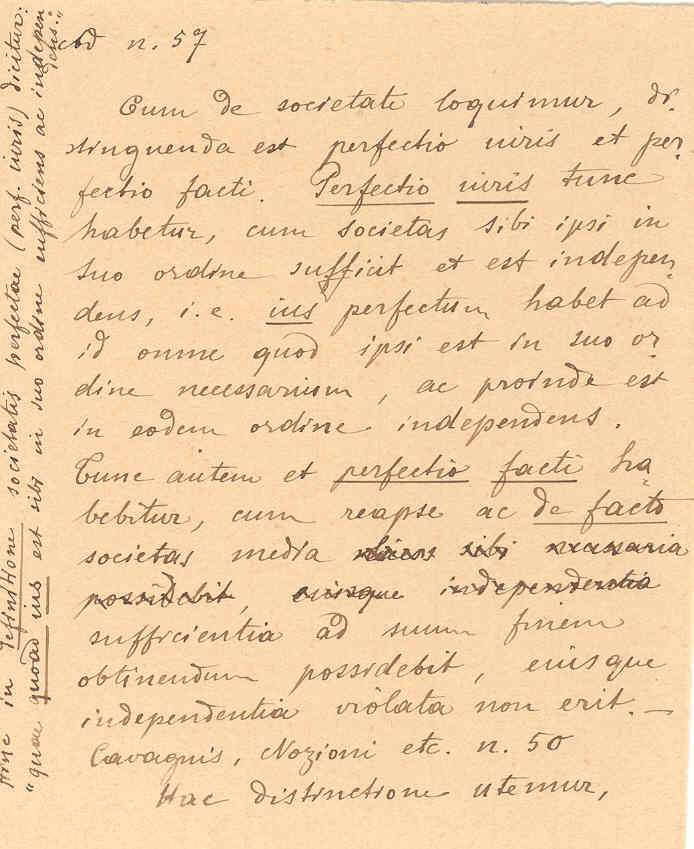
Handwritten document in Latin by Eugenio Pacelli (later Pope Pius XII), 1899

By 1900, creative Latin composition in many countries, for purely artistic purposes, had become rare. Authors such as Arthur Rimbaud and Max Beerbohm wrote Latin verse, but these texts were either school exercises or occasional pieces. However, the tradition was still strong enough in Holland, Croatia, Italy and elsewhere to sustain an annual Latin poetry competition, the Certamen Hoeufftianum, until 1978.

Classicists themselves were the last redoubt for use of Latin in an academic context. Textual commentaries to Latin texts could be made in Latin, for instance. Academic papers in Classics journals could sometimes be published in Latin.

Some of the last survivals of Neo-Latin to convey information appear in the use of Latin to cloak passages and expressions deemed too indecent to be read by children, the lower classes, or (most) women. Such passages appear in translations of foreign texts and in works on folklore, anthropology, and psychology. An example of this can be found in Krafft-Ebing's Psychopathia Sexualis (1886).

==== Official uses of Latin ====
A special case was the use of Latin in Hungary and Croatia, where it remained a language of government in the first half of the century. Papers were published in Latin in Hungary, and it was used as the language of Parliamentary debate. This was in large part a compromise between Hungarians and Croats, to both avoid the imposition of German, or their own languages, on each other. The legacy of the political situation meant that a strong Latin tradition continued in Croatia for some time afterwards, where Latin poetry continued to be produced for the remainder of the century.

The abolition of the Holy Roman Empire ended its use of Latin as an official language. Sweden continued to use Latin for diplomatic correspondence in the nineteenth century, as did the Vatican.

=== Latin from 1900 onwards ===
Latin as a language held a place of educational pre-eminence until the second half of the 19th century in the English speaking world. At that point its value was increasingly questioned. In the 20th century, educational philosophies such as that of John Dewey, although not categorically opposed to the teaching of Latin, questioned the usefulness of "drilling" syntactical and grammatical structures—especially when this happened in isolation from cultural and historical insight. At the same time, the philological study of Latin appeared to show that the traditional methods and materials for teaching Latin were dangerously out of date and ineffective.

Academic works in classical studies are still written in Latin. Such works, e.g. the prefaces for critical editions of ancient texts published by Teubner or Oxford Classical Texts, are however intended for international academic audiences speaking varied vernaculars who are already familiar with the language.

=== Relics ===
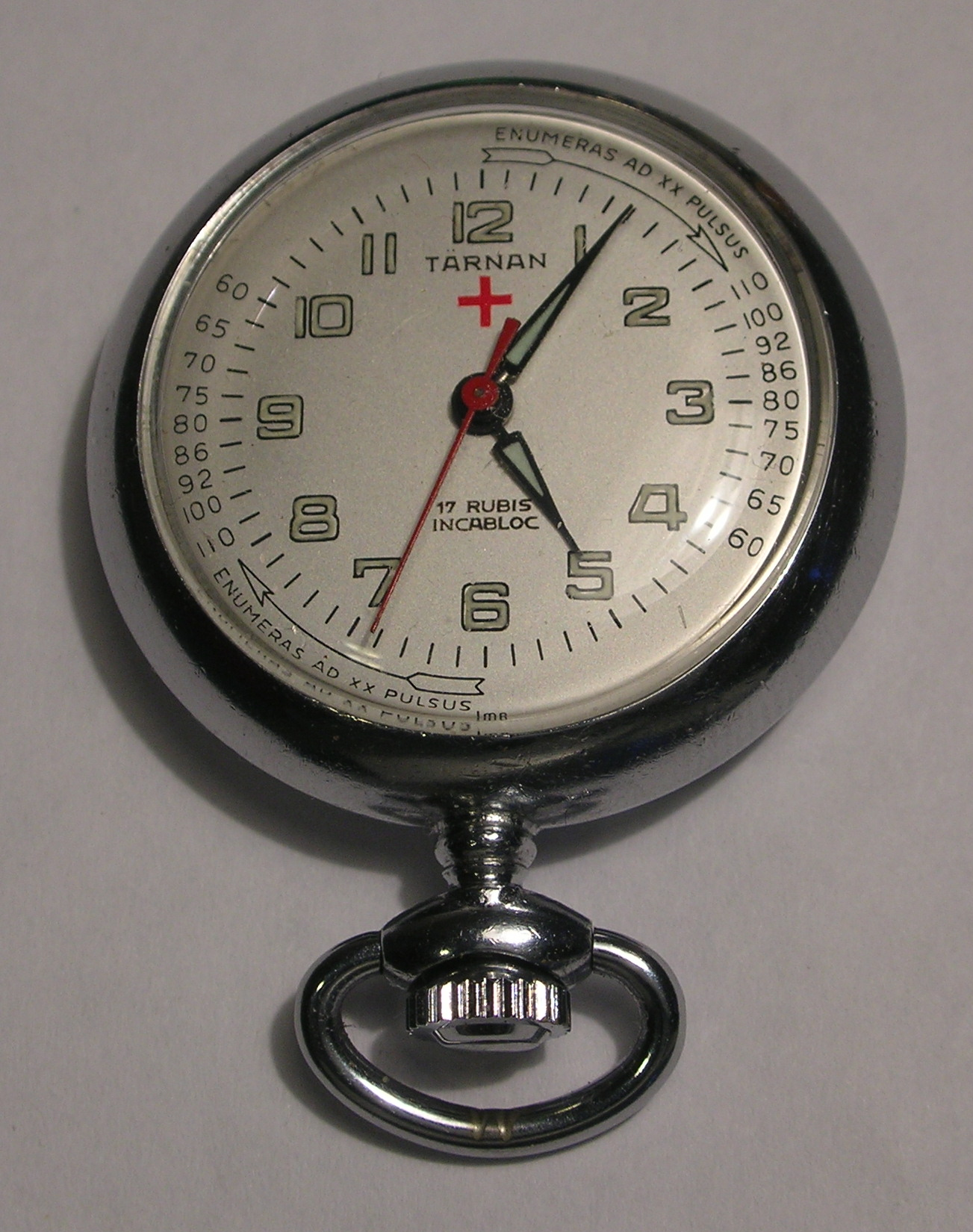
This pocket watch made for the medical community has Latin instructions for measuring a patient's pulse rate on its dial: enumeras ad XX pulsus, "count to 20 beats".

Ecclesiastical Latin, the form of Neo-Latin used in the Catholic Church, remained in use throughout the period and after. Until the Second Vatican Council of 1962–1965 all priests were expected to have competency in it, and it was studied in Catholic schools. It is today still the official language of the Church, and all Catholic priests of the Latin liturgical rites are required by canon law to have competency in the language. (Note: This requirement is found under canon 249 of the 1983 Code of Canon Law. See: "1983 Code of Canon Law". Libreria Editrice Vaticana. 1983. Archived from the original on 8 May 2011.)

Neo-Latin is also the source of the biological system of binomial nomenclature and classification of living organisms devised by Carl Linnaeus, although the rules of the ICZN allow the construction of names that deviate considerably from historical norms. (See also classical compounds.) Another continuation is the use of Latin names for the surface features of planets and planetary satellites (planetary nomenclature), originated in the mid-17th century for selenographic toponyms. Neo-Latin has also contributed a vocabulary for specialized fields such as anatomy and law; some of these words have become part of the normal, non-technical vocabulary of various European languages.

== Pronunciation ==
Neo-Latin had no single pronunciation, but a host of local variants or dialects, all distinct both from each other and from the historical pronunciation of Latin at the time of the Roman Republic and Roman Empire. As a rule, the local pronunciation of Latin used sounds identical to those of the dominant local language, the result of a concurrently evolving pronunciation in the living languages and the corresponding spoken dialects of Latin. Despite this variation, there are some common characteristics to nearly all of the dialects of Neo-Latin, for instance:

- The use of a sibilant fricative or affricate in place of a stop for the letters c and sometimes g, when preceding a front vowel.
- The use of a sibilant fricative or affricate for the letter t when not at the beginning of the first syllable and preceding an unstressed i followed by a vowel.
- The use of a labiodental fricative for most instances of the letter v (or consonantal u), instead of the classical labiovelar approximant /w/.
- A tendency for medial s to be voiced to [z], especially between vowels.
- The merger of æ and œ with e, and of y with i.
- The loss of the distinction between short and long vowels, with such vowel distinctions as remain being dependent upon word-stress.

The regional dialects of Neo-Latin can be grouped into families, according to the extent to which they share common traits of pronunciation. The major division is between Western and Eastern family of Neo-Latin. The Western family includes most Romance-speaking regions (France, Spain, Portugal, Italy) and the British Isles; the Eastern family includes Central Europe (Germany and Poland), Eastern Europe (Russia and Ukraine) and Scandinavia (Denmark, Sweden).

The Western family is characterized, inter alia, by having a front variant of the letter g before the vowels æ, e, i, œ, y and also pronouncing j in the same way (except in Italy). In the Eastern Latin family, j is always pronounced [ j ], and g had the same sound (usually [ɡ]) in front of both front and back vowels; exceptions developed later in some Scandinavian countries.

The following table illustrates some of the variation of Neo-Latin consonants found in various countries of Europe, compared to the Classical Latin pronunciation of the 1st centuries BC to AD. In Eastern Europe, the pronunciation of Latin was generally similar to that shown in the table below for German, but usually with [z] for z instead of [ts].

Roman letter	Pronunciation									
Roman letter	Classical	Western				Central		Eastern		
Roman letter	Classical	France	England	Portugal	Spain	Italy	Romania	Germany	Netherlands	Scandinavia
c before "æ", "e", "i", "œ", "y"	/ k /	/ s /	/ s /	/ s /	/ θ /	/ tʃ /	/ tʃ /	/ ts /	/ s /	/ s /
cc before "æ", "e", "i", "œ", "y"	/ kː /	/ ks /	/ ks /	/ ss /	/ kθ /	/ ttʃ /	/ ktʃ /	/ kts /	/ ks /	/ ks /
ch	/ kʰ /	/ ʃ /	/ tʃ /	/ tʃ /	/ tʃ /	/ k /	/ k /	/ k /, / x /	/ x /	/ k /
g before "æ", "e", i", "œ", "y"	/ ɡ /	/ ʒ /	/ dʒ /	/ ʒ /	/ x /	/ dʒ /	/ dʒ /	/ ɡ /	/ ɣ / or / x /	/ j /
j	/ j /	/ ʒ /	/ dʒ /	/ ʒ /	/ x /	/ j /	/ ʒ /	/ j /	/ j /	/ j /
qu before "a", "o", "u"	/ kʷ /	/ kw /	/ kw /	/ kw /	/ kw /	/ kw /	/ kv /	/ kv /	/kw /	/ kv /
qu before "æ", "e", "i"	/ kʷ /	/ k /	/ kw /	/ k /	/ k /	/ kw /	/ kv /	/ kv /	/kw /	/ kv /
s between vowels unless ss	/ s̠ /	/ z /	/ z /	/ z /	/ s /	/ z /	/ z /	/ z /	/ z /	/ s /
sc before "æ", "e", "i", "œ", "y"	/ sk /	/ s /	/ s /	/ s /	/ sθ /	/ ʃ /	/ stʃ /, / sk / (earlier / ʃt /)	/ sts /	/ s /	/ s /
t before unstressed i+vowel except initially or after "s", "t", "x"	/ t /	/ s /	/ ʃ /	/ s /	/ θ /	/ ts /	/ ts /	/ ts /	/ ts /	/ ts /
v	/ w /	/ v /	/ v /	/ v /	/ b / ([β])	/ v /	/ v /	/ f / or / v /	/ v /	/ v /
z	/ zz /	/ z /	/ z /	/ z /	/ θ /	/ dz /	/ z /	/ ts /	/ z /	/ s /

== Orthography ==
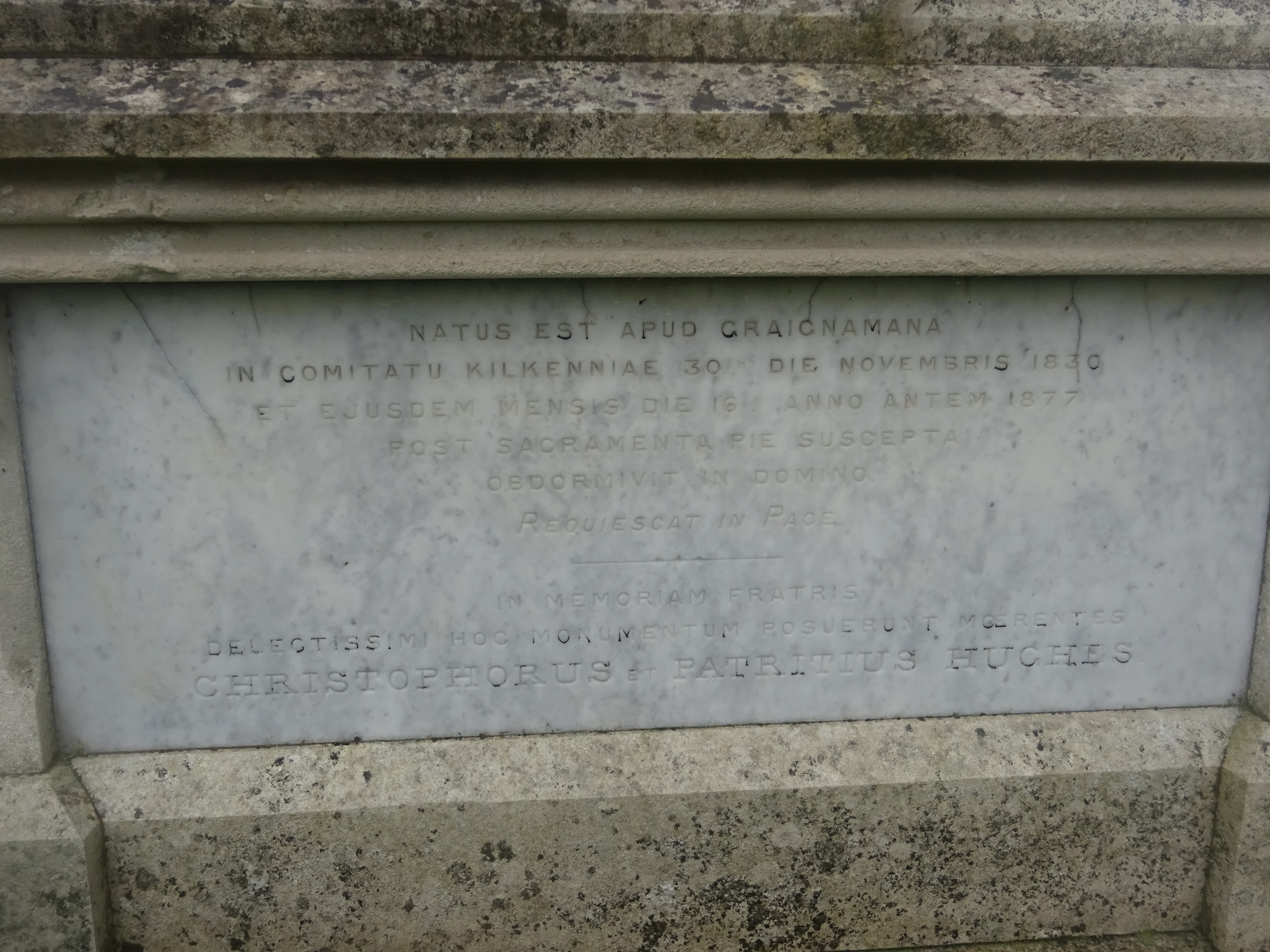
Latin grave inscription in Ireland, 1877; it uses distinctive letters U and J in words like APUD and EJUSDEM, and the digraph Œ in MŒRENTES.

Neo-Latin texts are primarily found in early printed editions, which present certain features of spelling and the use of diacritics distinct from the Latin of antiquity, medieval Latin manuscript conventions, and representations of Latin in modern printed editions.

=== Characters ===
In spelling, Neo-Latin, in all but the earliest texts, distinguishes the letter u from v and i from j. In older texts printed down to c. 1630, v was used in initial position (even when it represented a vowel, e.g. in vt, later printed ut) and u was used elsewhere, e.g. in nouus, later printed novus. By the mid-17th century, the letter v was commonly used for the consonantal sound of Roman V, which in most pronunciations of Latin in the Neo-Latin period was [v] (and not [w]), as in vulnus "wound", corvus "crow". Where the pronunciation remained [w], as after g, q and s, the spelling u continued to be used for the consonant, e.g. in lingua, qualis, and suadeo.

The letter j generally represented a consonantal sound (pronounced in various ways in different European countries, e.g. [j], [dʒ], [ʒ], [x]). It appeared, for instance, in jam "already" or jubet "he/she orders" (earlier spelled iam and iubet). It was also found between vowels in the words ejus, hujus, cujus (earlier spelled eius, huius, cuius), and pronounced as a consonant; likewise in such forms as major and pejor. J was also used when the last in a sequence of two or more i's, e.g. radij (now spelled radii) "rays", alijs "to others", iij, the Roman numeral 3; however, ij was for the most part replaced by ii by 1700.

In common with texts in other languages using the Roman alphabet, Latin texts down to c. 1800 used the letter-form ſ (the long s) for s in positions other than at the end of a word; e.g. ipſiſſimus.

The digraphs ae and oe were typically written using the ligatures æ and œ (e.g. Cæsar, pœna) except when part of a word in all capitals, such as in titles, chapter headings, or captions. More rarely (and usually in 16th- to early 17th-century texts) the e caudata was used as a substitute for the digraphs.

=== Diacritics ===
Three kinds of diacritic were in common use: the acute accent ´, the grave accent `, and the circumflex accent ˆ. These were normally only marked on vowels (e.g. í, è, â); but see below regarding que.

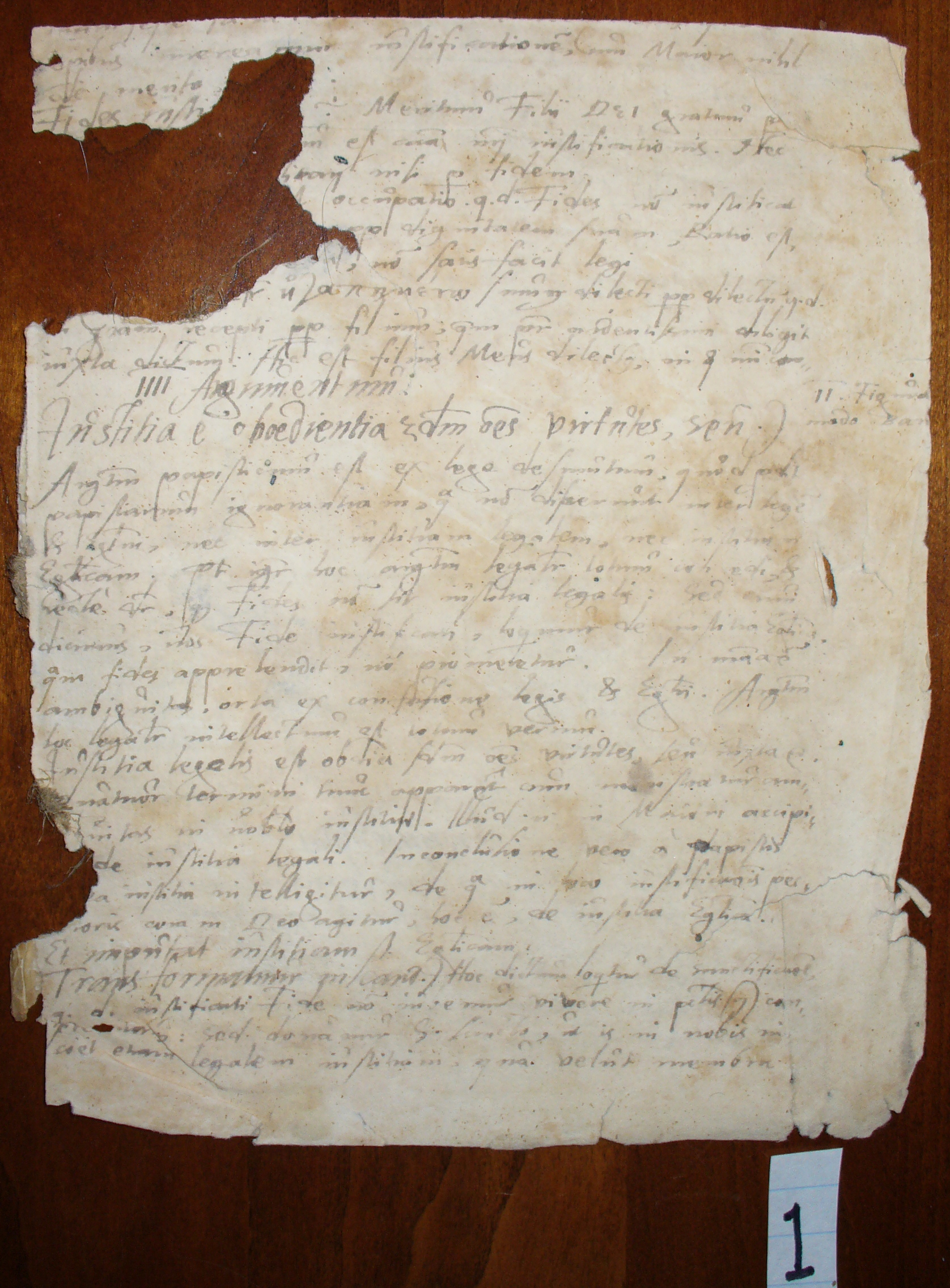
Handwriting in Latin from 1595

The acute accent marked a stressed syllable, but was usually confined to those where the stress was not in its normal position, as determined by vowel length and syllabic weight. In practice, it was typically found on the vowel in the syllable immediately preceding a final clitic, particularly que "and", ve "or" and ne, a question marker; e.g. idémque "and the same (thing)". Some printers, however, put this acute accent over the q in the enclitic que, e.g. eorumq́ue "and their". The acute accent fell out of favor by the 19th century.

The grave accent had various uses, none related to pronunciation or stress. It was always found on the preposition à (variant of ab "by" or "from") and likewise on the preposition è (variant of ex "from" or "out of"). It might also be found on the interjection ò "O". Most frequently, it was found on the last (or only) syllable of various adverbs and conjunctions, particularly those that might be confused with prepositions or with inflected forms of nouns, verbs, or adjectives. Examples include certè "certainly", verò "but", primùm "at first", pòst "afterwards", cùm "when", adeò "so far, so much", unà "together", quàm "than". In some texts the grave was found over the clitics such as que, in which case the acute accent did not appear before them.

The circumflex accent represented metrical length (generally not distinctively pronounced in the Neo-Latin period) and was chiefly found over an a representing an ablative singular case, e.g. eâdem formâ "with the same shape". It might also be used to distinguish two words otherwise spelled identically, but distinct in vowel length; e.g. hîc "here" differentiated from hic "this", fugêre "they have fled" (=fūgērunt) distinguished from fugere "to flee", or senatûs "of the senate" distinct from senatus "the senate". It might also be used for vowels arising from contraction, e.g. nôsti for novisti "you know", imperâsse for imperavisse "to have commanded", or dî for dei or dii.

== Notable works (1500–1900) ==
=== Literature and biography ===
- 1511. Stultitiæ Laus, essay by Erasmus.
- 1516. Utopia by Thomas More
- 1525 and 1538. Hispaniola and Emerita, two comedies by Juan Maldonado.
- 1546. Sintra, a poem by Luisa Sigea de Velasco.
- 1602. Cenodoxus, a play by Jacob Bidermann.
- 1608. Parthenica, two books of poetry by Elizabeth Jane Weston.
- 1621. Argenis, a novel by John Barclay.
- 1626–1652. Poems by John Milton.
- 1634. Somnium, a scientific fantasy by Johannes Kepler.
- 1685. Piscatoria et Nautica, a collection of didactic poems by Nicola Partenio Giannettasio.
- 1741. Nicolai Klimii Iter Subterraneum, a satire by Ludvig Holberg.
- 1761. Slawkenbergii Fabella, short parodic piece in Laurence Sterne's Tristram Shandy.
- 1767. Apollo et Hyacinthus, intermezzo by Rufinus Widl (with music by Wolfgang Amadeus Mozart).
- 1835. Georgii Washingtonii, Americæ Septentrionalis Civitatum Fœderatarum Præsidis Primi, Vita, biography of George Washington by Francis Glass.

=== Scientific works ===
- 1543. De Revolutionibus Orbium Cœlestium by Nicolaus Copernicus
- 1545. Ars Magna by Hieronymus Cardanus
- 1551–58 and 1587. Historia animalium by Conrad Gessner.
- 1600. De Magnete, Magneticisque Corporibus et de Magno Magnete Tellure by William Gilbert.
- 1609. Astronomia nova by Johannes Kepler.
- 1610. Sidereus Nuncius by Galileo Galilei.
- 1620. Novum Organum by Francis Bacon.
- 1628. Exercitatio Anatomica de Motu Cordis et Sanguinis in Animalibus by William Harvey.
- 1659. Systema Saturnium by Christiaan Huygens.
- 1673. Horologium Oscillatorium by Christiaan Huygens.
- 1687. Philosophiæ Naturalis Principia Mathematica by Isaac Newton.
- 1703. Hortus Malabaricus by Hendrik van Rheede.
- 1735. Systema Naturae by Carl Linnaeus.
- 1737. Mechanica sive motus scientia analytice exposita by Leonhard Euler.
- 1738. Hydrodynamica, sive de viribus et motibus fluidorum commentarii] by Daniel Bernoulli.
- 1747. Anti-lucretius by Cardinal de Polignac
- 1748. Introductio in analysin infinitorum by Leonhard Euler.
- 1753. Species Plantarum by Carl Linnaeus.
- 1758. Systema Naturae (10th ed.) by Carolus Linnaeus.
- 1791. De viribus electricitatis in motu musculari by Aloysius Galvani.
- 1801. Disquisitiones Arithmeticae by Carl Gauss.
- 1810. Prodromus Florae Novae Hollandiae et Insulae Van Diemen by Robert Brown.
- 1830. Fundamenta nova theoriae functionum ellipticarum by Carl Gustav Jacob Jacobi.
- 1840. Flora Brasiliensis by Carl Friedrich Philipp von Martius.
- 1864. Philosophia zoologica by Jan van der Hoeven.
- 1889. Arithmetices principia, nova methodo exposita by Giuseppe Peano

=== Other technical subjects ===
- 1511–1516. De Orbe Novo Decades by Peter Martyr d'Anghiera.
- 1514. De Asse et Partibus by Guillaume Budé.
- 1524. De motu Hispaniæ by Juan Maldonado.
- 1525. De subventione pauperum sive de humanis necessitatibus libri duo by Juan Luis Vives.
- 1530. Syphilis, sive, De Morbo Gallico by Girolamo Fracastoro
- 1531. De disciplinis libri XX by Juan Luis Vives.
- 1552. Colloquium de aulica et privata vivendi ratione by Luisa Sigea de Velasco.
- 1553. Christianismi Restitutio by Michael Servetus. A mainly theological treatise, where the function of pulmonary circulation was first described by a European, more than half a century before Harvey. For the non-trinitarian message of this book Servetus was denounced by Calvin and his followers, condemned by the French Inquisition, and burnt alive just outside Geneva. Only three copies survived.
- 1554. De naturæ philosophia seu de Platonis et Aristotelis consensione libri quinque by Sebastián Fox Morcillo.
- 1582. Rerum Scoticarum Historia by George Buchanan
- 1587. Minerva sive de causis linguæ Latinæ by Francisco Sánchez de las Brozas.
- 1589. De natura Novi Orbis libri duo et de promulgatione euangelii apud barbaros sive de procuranda Indorum salute by José de Acosta.
- 1597. Disputationes metaphysicæ by Francisco Suárez.
- 1599. De rege et regis institutione by Juan de Mariana.
- 1604–1608. Historia sui temporis by Jacobus Augustus Thuanus.
- 1612. De legibus by Francisco Suárez.
- 1615. De Christiana expeditione apud Sinas by Matteo Ricci and Nicolas Trigault.
- 1625. De jure belli ac pacis by Hugo Grotius.
- 1641. Meditationes de prima philosophia by René Descartes.
- 1642–1658. Elementa Philosophica by Thomas Hobbes.
- 1652–1654. Œdipus Ægyptiacus by Athanasius Kircher.
- 1655. Novus Atlas Sinensis by Martino Martini.
- 1656. Flora Sinensis by Michael Boym.
- 1657. Orbis Sensualium Pictus by John Amos Comenius.
- 1670. Tractatus Theologico-Politicus by Baruch Spinoza.
- 1677. Ethica, ordine geometrico demonstrata by Baruch Spinoza.
- 1689. Epistola de tolerantia by John Locke.
- 1725. Gradus ad Parnassum by Johann Joseph Fux. An influential treatise on musical counterpoint.
- 1780. De rebus gestis Caroli V Imperatoris et Regis Hispaniæ and De rebus Hispanorum gestis ad Novum Orbem Mexicumque by Juan Ginés de Sepúlveda.
- 1891. De primis socialismi germanici lineamentis apud Lutherum, Kant, Fichte et Hegel by Jean Jaurès

== See also ==
- Binomial nomenclature
- Botanical Latin
- Classical compound
- Contemporary Latin
- List of Neo-Latin authors
- Ludwig Boltzmann Institute for Neo-Latin Studies
- Neo-Latin studies
- New Ancient Greek
