= Colloquy =

Colloquy may refer to:

- Colloquy (religious), a meeting to settle differences of doctrine or dogma
- Colloquy (company), a loyalty marketing company based in Milford, Ohio
- Colloquy (law), a legal term
- Colloquy (IRC client), an IRC client for Mac OS X and iOS
- Colloquy (pedagogical dialogue) (Classical Studies), a set of scripted dialogues intended for practice in learning Latin or Ancient Greek, effectively a form of "language textbook."

== See also ==
- Northwestern University Law Review Colloquy, the online companion of the Northwestern University Law Review
