= Nicola Partenio Giannettasio =

Italian Jesuit and poet

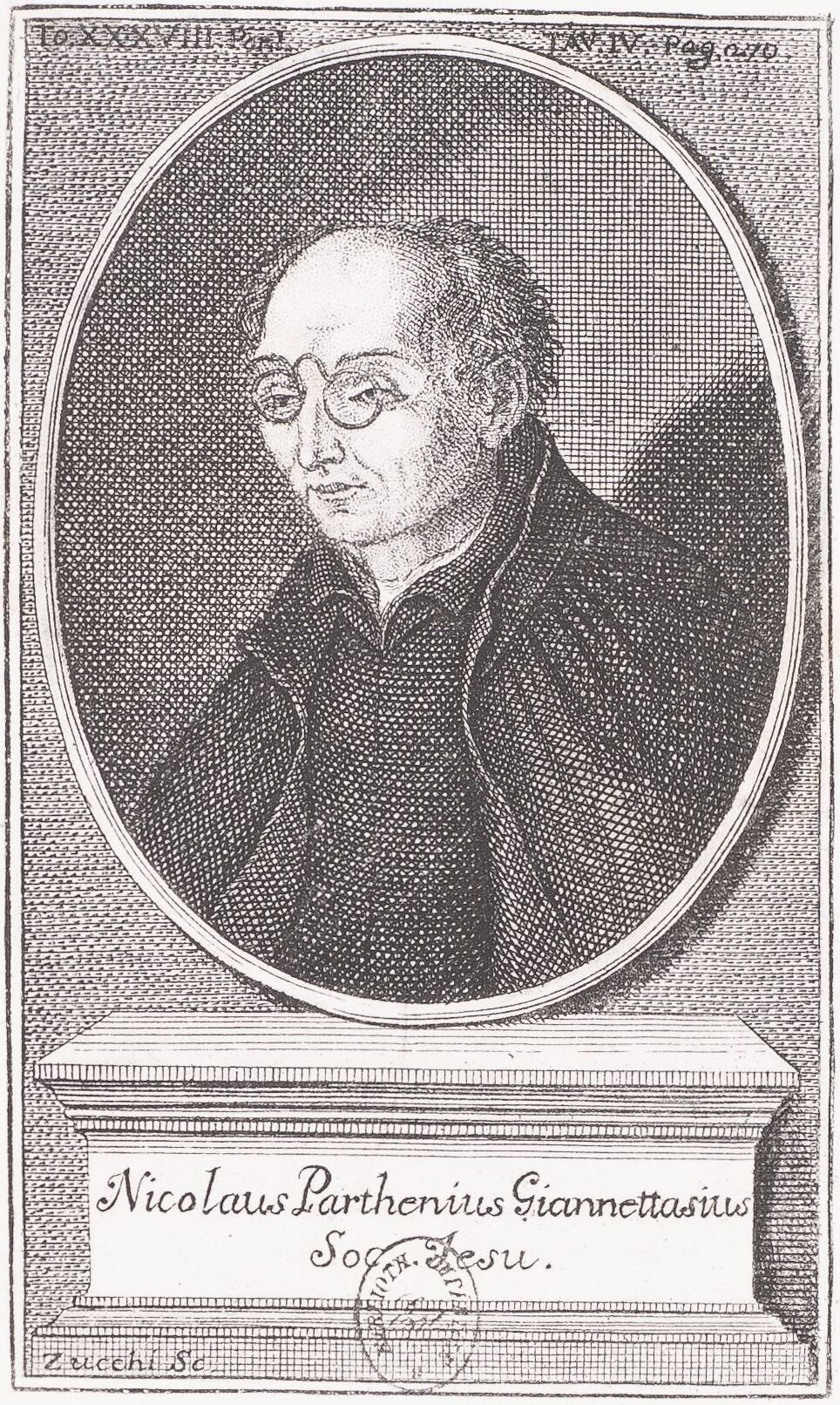
- Nicola Partenio Giannettasio
- Born: 5 March 1648; Naples, Kingdom of Naples
- Died: 10 September 1715 (aged 67); Massa Lubrense, Kingdom of Naples
- Occupations: Jesuit priest; Poet; Intellectual
- Writing career
- Language: Italian; Latin
- Notable work: Piscatoria et Nautica
- Literary movement: Baroque; Neoclassicism

Nicolò Partenio Giannettasio (5 March 1648 – 10 September 1715) was an Italian Jesuit and neo-Latin poet.

== Biography ==
Nicolò Giannettasio was born in Naples in 1648. He lost his entire family during the plague of 1656. He supplemented an erratic early education with private study and demonstrated a precocious talent for classical languages and mathematics. He studied Latin, Hebrew and ancient Greek, but also philosophy and law. On 7 September 1666, he entered the Society of Jesus. He took the sobriquet “Parthenius,” paying homage to the Virgin Mary. Giannettasio taught the classics at Amantea, theology at Palermo and Naples and scholastic philosophy at Reggio Calabria. In 1679, he was appointed professor of mathematics at the Collegio Massimo of Naples. He occupied the chair of mathematics at the college for over a quarter of a century. He died in Massa Lubrense in 1715. Giannettasio was a close friend of Giambattista Vico.

== Works ==
Giannettasio was one of the foremost neo-Latin authors of the late 17th century. Despite the distractions of academic life and despite miserably weak health, he never ceased to study and compose Latin poetry. His published verses were so extremely successful that he was actually able to build the church of Santa Maria del Gesù church in Sorrento with the proceeds.

Giannettasio's earliest work consists of fourteen piscatory eclogues inspired by Virgil and Sannazaro (two are epinicia, three are epicedia, three are religious, three are contemporary and personal, and one is epistolary). The success of the collection prompted him to write a second work, Nautica, a didactic poem on navigation in eight books. The two works were published together in an extremely successful volume (Piscatoria et Nautica, Naples, 1685) illustrated by the well-known painter Francesco Solimena, who appears as one of the characters in the third eclogue.

Besides his didactic poems, Giannettasio wrote also a Latin history of Naples, a collection of erudite dialogues (Annus eruditus), and an epic poem about the missionary journeys of Saint Francis Xavier entitled Xaverius viator seu Saberidos carmen, which was published in 1721, in the third volume of his Opera omnia.

== Bibliography ==
- Tarzia, Fabio (2000). "GIANNETTASIO, Nicola Partenio". Dizionario Biografico degli Italiani (in Italian). Vol. 54: Ghiselli–Gimma. Rome: Istituto dell'Enciclopedia Italiana. ISBN 978-88-12-00032-6.
- Schindler, Claudia (2003). "Vitreas Crateris ad undas. Le egloghe del pescatore di Nicolò Partenio Giannettasio (1648–1715)". Studi Umanistici Piceni. 23: 293–304.
- Haskell, Yasmin (2003). "The New Pontano? Niccolò 'Parthenius' Giannettasio". Loyola's Bees: Ideology and Industry in Jesuit Latin Didactic Poetry. OUP/British Academy. pp. 70–82. ISBN 9780197262849.
- Haskell, Yasmin (2007). "Poetry or Pathology? Jesuit Hypochondria in Early Modern Naples". Early Science and Medicine. 12 (2): 187–213. doi:10.1163/157338207x194686. JSTOR 20617663. PMID 18173170.
- Schindler, Claudia (2016). "Exploring the Distinctiveness of Neo-Latin Jesuit Didactic Poetry in Naples: The Case of Nicolò Partenio Giannettasio". Exploring Jesuit Distinctiveness: 187–213. doi:10.1163/9789004313354_004. ISBN 9789004313354.
