= Colloquies =

1518 book by Desiderius Erasmus

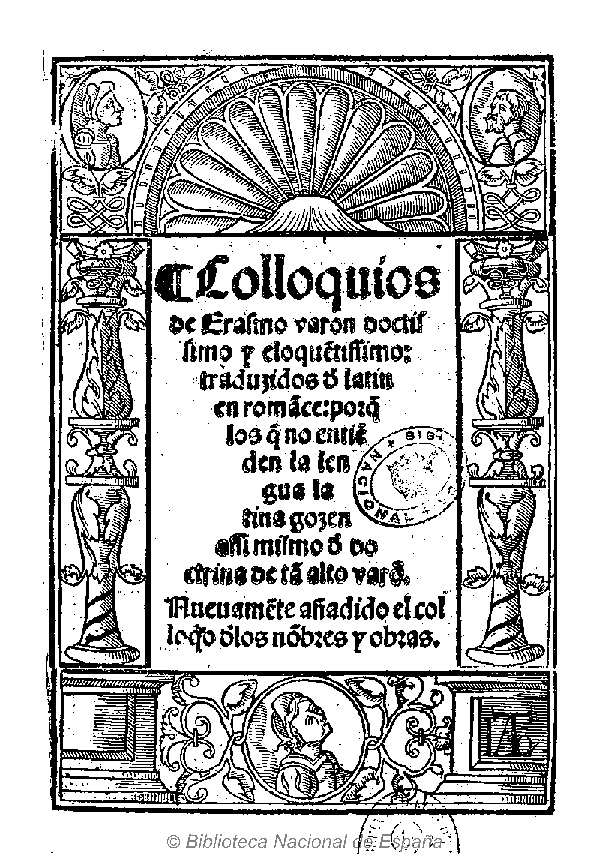

Colloquies (Latin title Colloquia familiaria) is a book by Desiderius Erasmus, a Dutch theologian and educationalist considered the "Prince of Christian Humanists". It was published in 1518 as Latin dialogues for schoolboy exercises, but the work expanded over the following decades with witty but more serious and controversial content. Among other things, the pages "...held up contemporary religious practices for examination in a more serious but still pervasively ironic tone".

Colloquium in Latin means a conversation or discussion.

== Overview ==
The Colloquies is a collection of dialogues or skits on a wide variety of subjects.

- They began in the late 1490s as informal Latin exercises for Erasmus' own pupils.
- The first official version, of 1518, was "a collection of formulae and conversational passages."
- In about 1522 he began to perceive the possibilities this form might hold for continuing his campaign for the gradual enlightenment and reform of all Christendom.
- Between that date and 1533 twelve new editions appeared, each larger and more serious than the last, until eventually some fifty individual colloquies, of between two and fifty pages each, were included ranging over such varied subjects as war, travel, good and bad lay religion, sleep, beggars' tricks, funeral superstitions, manners and customs, the need to give prostitutes a practical way out of their lifestyle, and literature.

A recent count identified over 100 published editions.

The colloquies were generally written in a graceful, easy style and gentle (though sometimes scathing) humor that made them continually sought as schoolboy exercises and adult light reading for generations. However, as the Protestant Reformation unfolded, the Colloquies, with its sometimes racy themes, became a target for censorship.

The Colloquies were widely translated, but often with selections, expurgations, adjustments and reinterpretation to suit sectarian agendas, and sometimes with Erasmus' authorship muted.

== Summaries ==
=== Naufragium (Shipwreck) ===
Naufragium is an exciting description of a shipwreck, complete with St Elmo's fire; it likely contributed to the first scenes of Shakespeare's play The Tempest. When abandoning ship, different characters' superstitious and pious practices are contrasted.

=== Amicitia (Friendship) ===
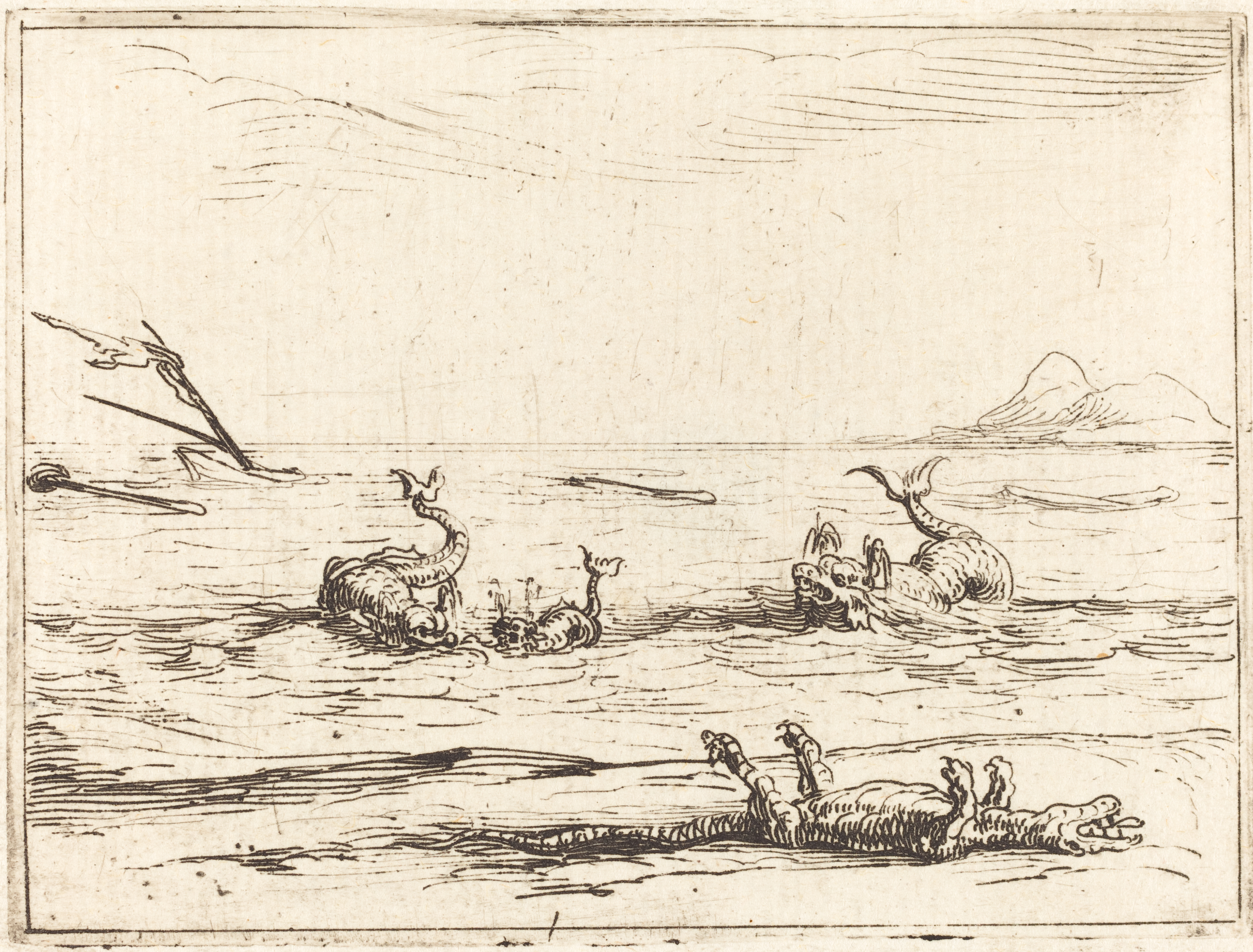
Jacques Callot, Dolphins and Crocodile, etching c. 1615

In Amicitia, numerous tall and folk stories (from Pliny) concerning the peculiar loves and hates of various animals and natural objects are the MacGuffin for a vocabulary-building exercise: how Italian green snakes love human spittle (and may crawl into your mouth when sleeping, to prevent which you can employ a guard lizard!) but hate garlic; how dolphins and crocodiles are mortal enemies; how elephants are so kind, but hate Indian dragons and mice; how Thomas More's monkey performed carpentry to thwart a weasel; how diamonds grow soft in goat's blood, and scores more.

The moral at the conclusion is that "Christian Charity extends itself to all but Familiarity is to be contracted with but few" and that Christian charity entails doing no hurt but desiring to grow better, even for a bad person.

=== Opulentia sordida (The wealthy miser) ===
Opulentia sordida is thinly veiled attack on the inadequate food and board for the workers in printer Aldus Manutius's household: what the Italians bear would make German workers run away to join the army.

=== The Young Man and the Harlot ===
In this dialogue Adolescentis et scorti, a prostitute Lucretia is visited by a former customer of hers, Sophrinius, who wants to see her in private. He wants to have a nice conversation. He is there to influence her to give up her self-destructive occupation, having read Erasmus' Paraphrase of the New Testament and then repented to a kind confessor. She mentions that the name of Erasmus is well known in the brothels, because so many priests and monks say how bad he is. Sophrinius says he will assist her, either to pay her dowry to marry, or to help her join a convent for cracked women, or to go to some far-away place and start a new life. Lucretia agrees to leave immediately.

=== Peregrinatio religionis ergo (A religious pilgrimage) ===
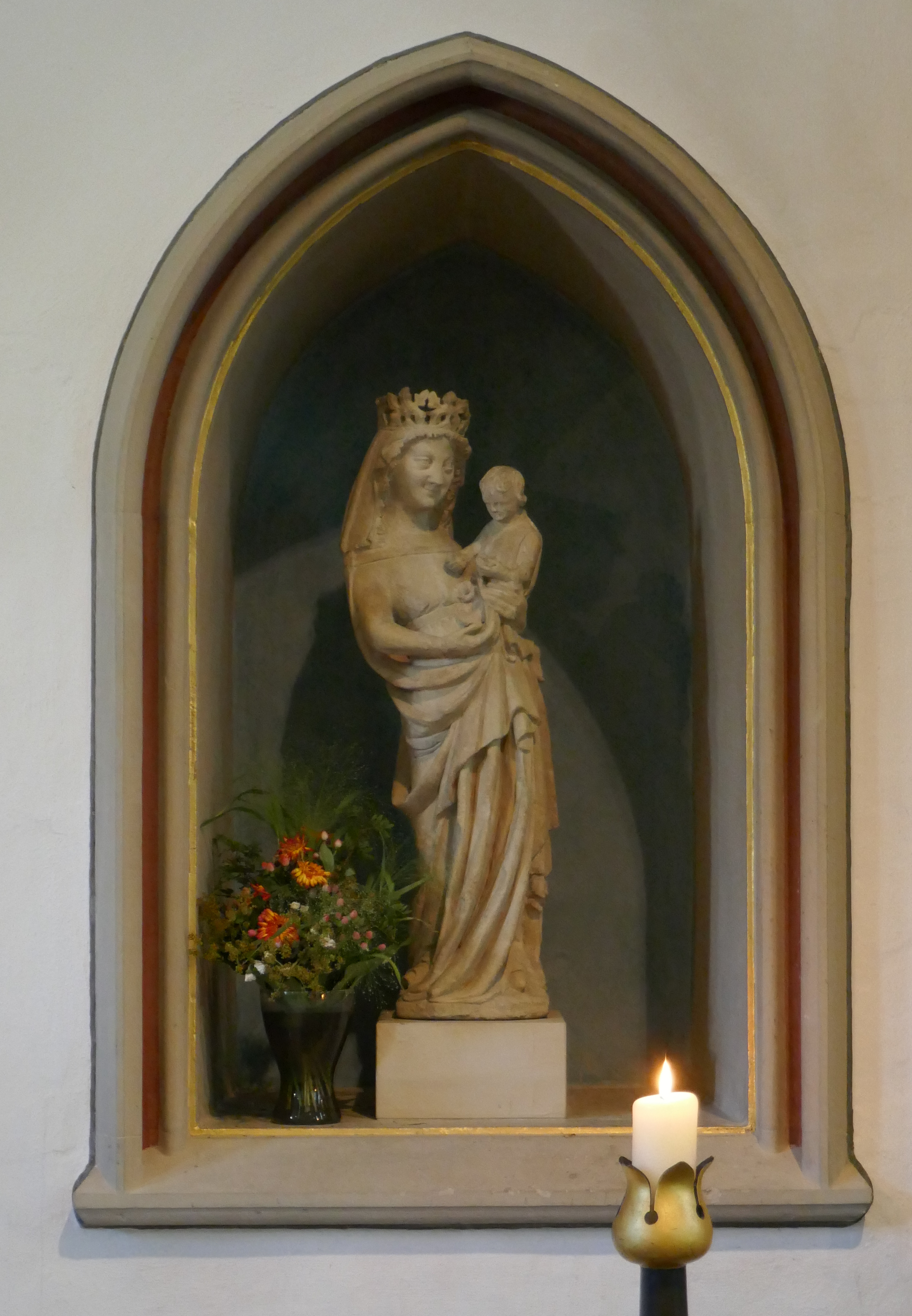
Stone 14th century statue of Mary and Jesus, St Stephanus church, Beckum, Germany

The lengthy Peregrinatio religionis ergo deals with many serious subjects humorously; it scandalously (e.g. to Peter Canisius) includes a letter supposedly written by a statue of the Virgin Mary, in which it initially thanks a reformer for following Martin Luther against needlessly invoking saints (where the listed invocations are all for sinful or wordly things), but then warns that this "conveniency" has brought even greater "inconveniency" from those who want "to strip the Altars and Temples of the Saints everywhere." It concludes "I wear no weapons, but you shall not turn me out unless you turn out my Son too, whom I hold in my arms."

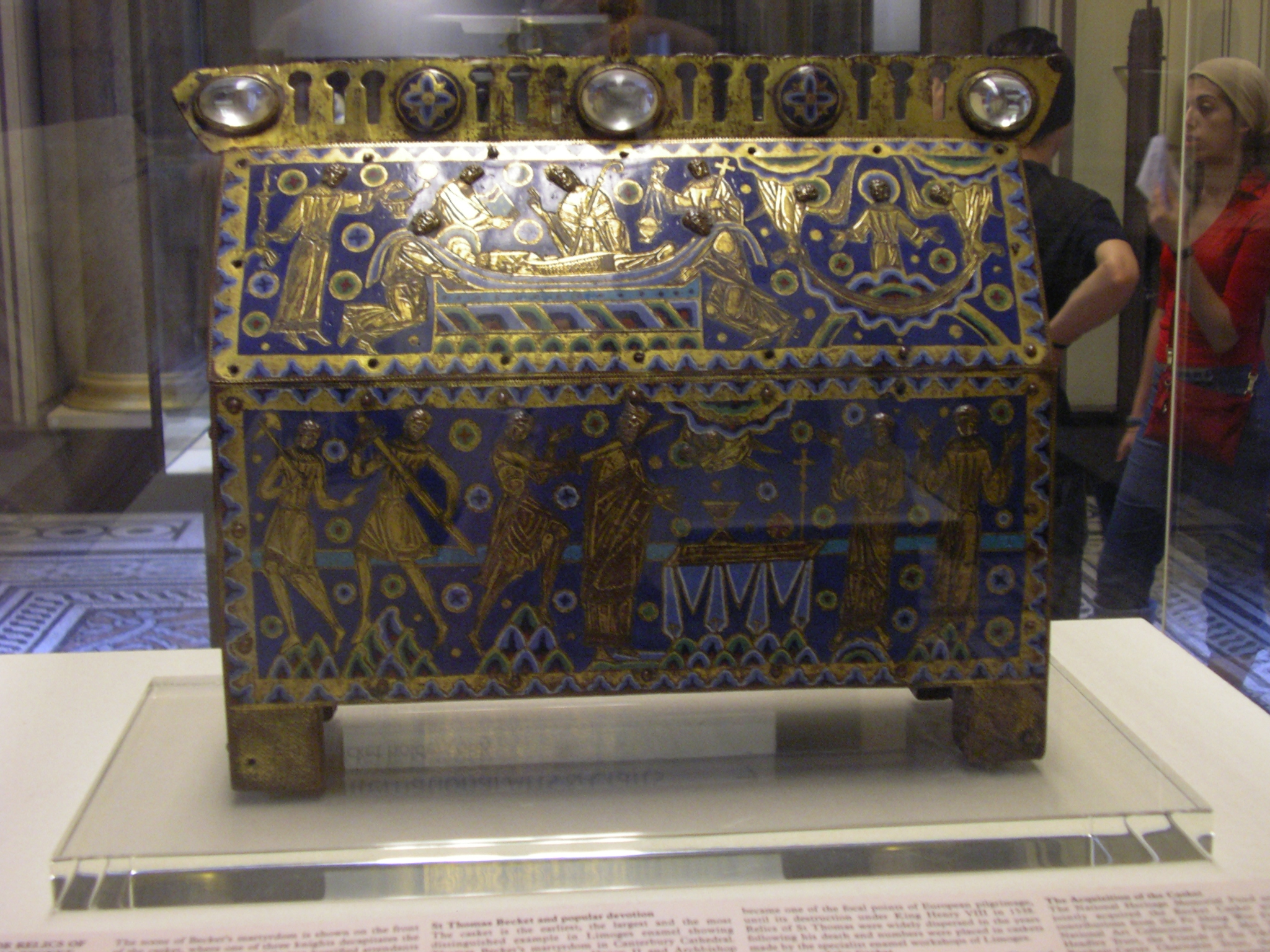
Casket of Thomas a Beckett

The bulk of the colloquy are accounts (in turns sardonic and interested) of pilgrimages Erasmus had made in England: to the then pre-eminent English Marian shrine at Walsingham and to Thomas a Beckett's shrine at Canterbury (with John Colet), segueing into discussions of fables in general, lavish funerals, and not leaving affairs to saints that are up to us.

In a typical Erasmus pivot to moderation and pacifism, a character comments about lavish shrines: "There is no man, either of piety or wisdom, but would wish for a moderation in these matters; but since error proceeds from a certain extreme of piety, it deserves some favour, especially when we reflect on the other hand, on the contrary error of others, who rob churches rather than build them up. (The lavish shrines) are commonly endowed by great men and monarchs, who would (otherwise) employ the money worse in gaming, or war."

=== Inquisitio de fide (Inquisition of faith) ===
The dialogue Inquisitio de fide was added in 1523 and treated the question of whether Lutherans were heretics: a Catholic is surprised to learn from his friend that current Lutherans should not be considered heretics, because they assent to the articles of the Creed.

Erasmus was in discussions on making the response to Luther that became On Free Will (and On the Immense Mercy of God), and his approach was to contain heresy by conciliation. For this he wanted to first calm the waters and establish clear boundaries for prospective Lutherans and over-enthusiastic heresy-hunters.

=== Epicureus (The Epicurean) ===
Erasmus' last colloquy, Epicureus is, despite its form, a piece of great interest to scholars, as in it Erasmus discusses various classical Greek philosophical movements which had fallen out of favour for a millennium following Augustine's Aristotelianism: the Stoics, Cynics, the Peripatetics, before inventing a novel Christian Epicureanism by equating pleasure with faith and a clear conscience.

=== Others ===
Many of the colloquies are warnings against credulity: being tricked or finagled.

- The Penitent Virgin is about being conned by monks by a "spiritual wedding" ceremony when becoming a novice nun.
- The Exorcism or Apparition is about imposters spreading rumours or supernatural events.
- The Alchemist is a scam where a priest tricks an old man out of money, involving alchemy and sending gold to the Virgin Mary.
- The Horse Cheat is about the tricks that horse dealers use.
- The Beggars’ Dialog is about tricks employed by beggars such as pickpocketing.

== Editions and translations ==
- Desiderius Erasmus, Colloquies, trans. by Craig R. Thompson, Collected Works of Erasmus, 39–40, 2 vols (Toronto: University of Toronto Press, 1997), II, 631ff.
- Desiderius Erasmus, The Colloquies of Erasmus, trans. by Nathan Bailey, ed. by E. Johnson (scanned books original editions)
  - Vol I and II (London: Reeves and Turner, 1878)
  - Vol III (London: Gibbings and Company, 1900)
