= Bursa (education) =

Historical type of dormitory for students

- Latin: Bursa
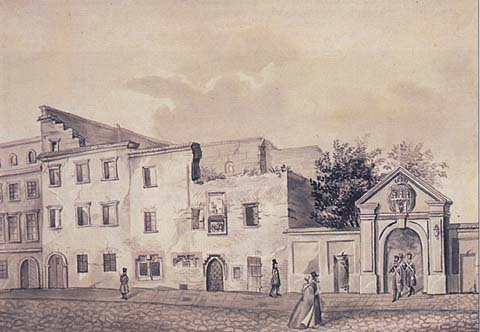
- The Jan Długosz Bursa in Kraków, demolished in 1840
- Type: Student dormitory / Boarding school
- Purpose: Housing for students of theological schools and universities
- Location: Europe (esp. France, Polish–Lithuanian Commonwealth, Russian Empire)

Bursa (from Latin: bursa – "purse", "pouch") was a type of boarding school or dormitory for students, primarily at theological schools (seminaries, collegiums, academies) in the Middle Ages and early modern period, particularly in Eastern Europe (in the Polish–Lithuanian Commonwealth, Ukraine, Belarus, and Russia).

In the Middle Ages, the word "bursa" meant a common treasury of a union or institution, such as a monastery or brotherhood. Later, it came to refer primarily to the treasury of a student dormitory and to the dormitory building itself.

== History ==
Such dormitories, called "Burses," originated primarily in France, where, mostly through the funds of benefactors (and later for a fee), university students were provided with a common apartment. The students living there together (called Bursarii or Bursiati) were under strict supervision, could not go out without permission, had to dress according to regulations, etc. This institution spread to other countries and often had the character of a private enterprise only. In France, the term (Bourse) still refers to many gratuitous vacancies in boarding schools at educational institutions or scholarships for students.

=== Grand Duchy of Lithuania ===
The former Ambrosian Bursa in Didžioji Street, Vilnius. A part of the Pac Palace since XVII century

In the Grand Duchy of Lithuania, bursas functioned as dormitories within educational institutions such as collegiums, monastery and brotherhood schools, and theological seminaries. Life in these institutions was characterized by strict discipline, resembling monastic rules.

The Jesuits were generally critical of bursas because they required significant staff and funds for maintenance. They preferred students to live and be educated in open institutions and private homes. Consequently, at their collegiums, the Jesuits mostly opened only small bursas for the poor, known as "music bursas" (bursy muzyczne). Dormitories specifically for the nobility were distinguished by a different term — konvikt (convictus).

Academic bursas existed at the Vilnius Academy due to the large number of students arriving from across the Grand Duchy. Notable bursas in Vilnius included:

- Valerian Bursa (founded in 1579 by the Bishop of Vilnius Walerian Protasewicz);
- Ambrosian Bursa (1602, founded by Canon Ambroży Beinart for poor students);
- Korsak Bursa (1618, founded by the Ashmyany land judge Jan Korsak; intended for 10 students from the Korsak family and 10 students from other noble families);
- Zhabinski Bursa (1651, founded by Dean Zhabinski; a music bursa).

Funds for the maintenance of bursas were derived from the income of villages, urban houses, and cash sums donated by benefactors.

=== Russian Empire ===
In the Russian Empire (including territories of modern Ukraine and Belarus annexed after the Partitions of Poland), the name "bursa" was primarily associated with a special dormitory at the Kiev Brotherhood School (later the Kiev Theological Academy). It arose in the first half of the 17th century under Peter Mogila, who transformed the almshouse at the school into a permanent residence for needy students. Their number was large (from 200 to 500). The situation of the residents (so-called bursaks) became very unenviable by the end of the 17th century: the housing, food, and clothing offered to them free of charge were very poor. A common means of supporting the material condition of the bursa in the late 17th and throughout almost the entire 18th century was the collection of voluntary alms by the students themselves. They solemnly elected annually from their midst two so-called prefects, several assistants, and secretaries; these electees were given a special book (Album), with which they went around the citizens of Kyiv and the inhabitants of the surrounding area. In addition, many bursaks formed traveling artels to earn the funds they needed by singing chants, reciting speeches and poems, performing various plays, and conducting church services. In the second half of the 18th century, the situation of the Kiev bursa began to improve: under Metropolitan Arseniy Mohyliansky, it was moved from a wooden building to a stone one; in 1786, the collection of donations by students was finally prohibited.

From the Kiev Theological Academy, the name passed generally to all dormitories at theological educational institutions, especially at seminaries. In the first half of the 19th century, the condition of these bursas was still pitiable: extreme untidiness and neglect of premises, abuses in the provision of food and clothing to students, unhygienic living conditions, cruelty in the treatment of students, and irrational pedagogical methods (intimidation, inciting hostility between bursaks, etc.) gave the bursas of that time a negative reputation. This environment was vividly described by Nikolai Pomyalovsky in his Seminary Sketches (Ocherki bursy, 1862–1863).

== In literature ==
Bursas and bursaks are frequently depicted in literature, often highlighting the harsh conditions and unique culture of these institutions:

- Seminary Sketches by Nikolai Pomyalovsky.
- Taras Bulba and Viy by Nikolai Gogol (characters like Ostap, Andriy, and Khoma Brut are bursaks).
- Bursak by Vasily Narezhny.
- Diary of a Seminarist by Ivan Nikitin.

== See also ==
- Collegium (Jesuit)
- Konwikt
- Seminary

== Bibliography ==
- "Бурса". Вялікае княства Літоўскае: Энцыклапедыя [Grand Duchy of Lithuania: Encyclopedia] (in Belarusian). Vol. 3. Мінск: Беларуская Энцыклапедыя. 2010. p. 696. ISBN 978-985-11-0487-7.
- Булгаков, М. (1843). История Киевской духовной академии [History of the Kiev Theological Academy] (in Russian). Saint Petersburg.
