= Colloquy (pedagogical dialogue) =

Classical teaching tool

A colloquy (Latin colloquium) is a set of scripted dialogues intended for practice in learning Latin or Ancient Greek. Colloquies were a form of "language textbook" (so to speak) but long before the invention of modern language textbooks as we understand them.

Classical colloquies were intended to instruct learners to speak or converse in ancient classical languages. Nowadays, attempting to converse in ancient languages is somewhat rare and sometimes even discouraged. However, this activity was not rare in previous centuries. Scholars were encouraged to use these languages as spoken languages.

In some cases, colloquies included general moralistic guidance on personal deportment or modes of proper conduct in everyday scenarios.

Colloquia describe familiar situations and interactions of everyday life. This means that they often serve as a source of information about clothes, food, routines, education, and material culture of people in various centuries.

== Notable works: Colloquies in Latin or Ancient Greek ==
- 3rd C. CE. Hermeneumata Pseudodositheana: Instructional manual for teaching the Greek language to Latin-speaking people in the Roman Empire, and vice versa: to teach Latin to Greek-speakers. Written by a native speaker of Latin. See: Corpus glossariorum latinorum at the Internet Archive
- 10th C. CE. Ælfric’s Colloquy: bilingual Latin-Old English dialogues. See: Early Scholastic Colloquies at the Internet Archive
- 15th C. CE. Manuale Scholarium: Latin dialogues between medieval university students, partly insulting and rowdy. See: The Manuale scholarium; an original account of life in the mediaeval university at the Internet Archive
- 1518. Colloquies: Latin colloquy by Desiderius Erasmus (ordinarily cited with the simple title "Colloquies") See: The colloquies of Erasmus at the Internet Archive

== See also ==
- Classics
- Neo-Latin
- Renaissance Latin
- Erasmus of Rotterdam
