= Landseer (disambiguation) =

Sir Edwin Landseer (1802–1873) was a British painter.

Landseer may also refer to:

- Landseer (dog), a black-and-white variant of the Newfoundland, named after the painter
- Landseer (horse) (1999–2002), thoroughbred racehorse trained in Ireland
- Denning Landseer, Australian road coach

== People with the surname ==
- Albert Henry Landseer (1829–1906), South Australian politician and businessman
- Charles Landseer (1799–1879), English painter
- Jessica Landseer (1810–1880), English landscape and miniature painter
- John Landseer (1769–1852), English landscape engraver
- Thomas Landseer (c.1793–1880), English artist

== See also ==
- Landseer Park, Suffolk, England
- Landser (disambiguation)
