= List of Classical Colloquia =

This page lists colloquies (Latin colloquia), which are scripted dialogues (a form of textbook) written for language instruction and practice in Classical languages such as Latin or Ancient Greek.

This list includes colloquies from any time period: ancient, medieval, Scholastic, Renaissance, or later times including the present day.

For the purpose of this list, we use the same definition of "Classical languages" as is used at Classics departments at major European and North American universities, and indeed the same definition used at the Wikipedia Classics page: Latin and Ancient Greek.

However, colloquies in other classical languages can also be listed here, provided that they take the same form: a scripted dialogue whose main purpose is to show examples of useful phrases in the target language, for pedagogical purposes.

Especially significant or influential works and authors are highlighted in yellow, below.

== List of Classical Colloquia ==
Year	Author	Titles	Lat	Grk	Other lang	Comment
900	Ælfric of Eynsham	Ælfric's Colloquy	yes	no	Old Eng.	
200	anonymous	Hermeneumata Pseudodositheana ; Ἑρμηνεύματα	yes	yes		Parts were attributed to Dositheus Magister, hence the name Pseudodositheana. Composed as a Greek-Latin schoolbook in late antiquity, probably around the third century CE. The work was originally composed to help Greeks learn Latin, but in the medieval West, it came to be widely used as a source for Latin-literate authors to learn about Greek.
1400	anonymous	Manuale Scholarium	yes	no	German	Latin dialogues between medieval university students (primarily two students, Camillus and Bartoldus) partly insulting and rowdy.
1518	Desiderius Erasmus	Colloquies Colloquia familiaria; Familiaria Colloquia	yes	no		Often cited with the simple title "Colloquies" or as Colloquia familiaria
1594 (2020)	Gretser, Jacob (1594) and Fergus Walsh (ed., 2020)	Four Greek Dialogues Progymnasmata Latinitatis	no	yes	English	Translated by Jacob Gretser (1594) from Pontanus' Progymnasmata Latinitatis (1578)
1587	Posselius, Johannes (Senior)	De formulis colloquiorum quotidianorum De formulis colloquiorum quotidianorum libellus ; Καθημερινῆς ὁμιλίας βιβλίον	yes	no		This work was later expanded by Posselius's son, Posselius, Johannes (Junior), and published under the title Familiarium Colloquium Graece et Latine Libellus, with added dialogues and material.
1656 (2017)	Posselius, Johannes (Junior) (1656); bedwere (ed., 2017)	Book of Domestic Dialogues Book of Domestic Dialogues in Greek and Latin ; Οἰκείων διαλόγων βιβλίον Ἑλληνιστὶ καὶ Ῥωμαϊστί; Familiarium Colloquium Graece et Latine Libellus	yes	yes	English	Familiarium Colloquium Graece et Latine Libellus is generally ascribed to Johannes Posselius (Junior). However, some sources suggest this work is an expansion of an earlier work titled Καθημερινῆς ὁμιλίας βιβλίον (De formulis colloquiorum quotidianorum libellus) written by his father Johannes Posselius (Senior). The younger Posselius is credited with the definitive and widely published versions that circulated during the 16th and 17th centuries, often with added dialogues and material.
1871	Blackie, John Stuart	Greek and English Dialogues, for Use in Schools and Colleges	no	yes	English	
1657	Corderius, Maturinus, Charles Hoole (trnsl.)	School Colloquies "Colloquia" ; "Colloquiorum scholasticorum libri quatuor"; "M. Corderius's School Colloquies, English and Latine"	yes			Corderius possessed special tact and liking for teaching children, and wrote several books for them; the most famous is his Colloquia (Colloquiorum scholasticorum libri quatuor), which has passed through innumerable editions, and was used in schools for three centuries after his time.
1533 (?)	Maturinus Corderius	Distichs of Cato "The Cato" ; Catonis Disticha ; Disticha de moribus nomine Catonis inscripta	yes	no	French	Latin collection of proverbial wisdom and morality by an unknown author from the 3rd or 4th century AD. The Cato was prized not only as a Latin textbook, but as a moral compass. Cato was in common use as a Latin teaching aid in the 18th century when it was used by Benjamin Franklin. It was one of the best-known books in the Middle Ages and was translated into many languages. It was still used in schools in parts of Britain in the 19th century. Corderius made the French translation, enriching it with commentaries on classical authors. His work was aimed at children with a summary, verses and an analysis of the structure. It was actually a grammatical treatise.
1659	Charles Hoole	Pueriles Confabulatiunculæ "Children's Talk. English and Latin"	yes	no	English	Charles Hoole also translated Cordier's Disticha Catonis into English
1525	Schottenius, Hermann	Colloquia Sive Confabulationes Tyronum Literatorum Tyronum literatorum colloquia, sive Confabulationes	yes	no		
800	anonymous	De raris fabulis "On uncommon tales"; "On curious tales"; "On rare expressions"	yes	no	Glosses in: Old Cornish; Old Welsh; Old English	Purpose was teaching spoken Latin to monastic oblates. For this reason they mostly concern daily life in a monastic environment, although there are also references to trade and pilgrimage.
800	anonymous	Colloquia e libro De raris fabulis retractata	yes	no		This is a new set of colloquies, based edits to De raris fabulis

== Recent Editions of Classical Colloquia ==
Listed here are editions that were recently published and/or translated and/or digitally transcribed, in a convenient format for modern readers.

Year or century	Orig. Author	Title	Details
1929	anonymous	De raris fabulis	Stevenson, W. H., ed. (1929). "De raris fabulis". Early Scholastic Colloquies. Clarendon Press. pp. 1–10.
2004	anonymous	De raris fabulis	Gwara, Scott, ed. (2004). De Raris Fabulis, "On Uncommon Tales": A Glossed Latin Colloquy-Text From a Tenth-Century Cornish Manuscript. University of Cambridge, Department of Anglo-Saxon, Norse & Celtic.

== Older Editions and Archives ==
Listed here are references or links to older books or archived books, which are probably available only as digital scans or in hard copy. (See above for a separate list of recent published editions.)

- De raris fabulis: Stokes, Whitley (1860–1861). "Cambrica". Transactions of the Philological Society. 7: 204–249, 288–293. (at pp. 238–249)

== See also ==
- Classics
- Neo-Latin
- Ancient Greek
- Renaissance Latin
- Erasmus of Rotterdam

== Bibliography ==
=== Secondary literature ===
- Boucherie (1868). "Étude sur les Hermèneumata du Ms. 306 de la bibliothèque de l'École de Médecine de Montpellier". Comptes rendus des séances de l'Académie des Inscriptions et Belles-Lettres. 12 (1): 270–277. doi:10.3406/crai.1868.67473.
- Charles-Edwards, T. M. (2013). Wales and the Britons, 350–1064. Oxford University Press.
- Gwara, Scott (2004a). "Diogenes the Cynic in the Scholastic Dialogues Called De raris fabulis". American Notes and Queries. 17 (1): 3–6. ProQuest 216723529
- Gwara, Scott (2007). "A Possible Arthurian Epitome in a Tenth-Century Manuscript from Cornwall". Arthuriana. 17 (2): 3–9. doi:10.1353/art.2007.0000. JSTOR 27870833.
- Gwara, Scott (2017). "Colloquies". The Encyclopedia of Medieval Literature in Britain. Wiley. pp. 1–3. doi:10.1002/9781118396957.wbemlb106. ISBN 978-1-118-39698-8.
- Hall, Thomas N. (2009). "Ælfric as Pedagogue". In Hugh Magennis; Mary Swan (eds.). A Companion to Ælfric. Brill. pp. 193–216.
