= The Dying Warrior =

Painting by Charles Landseer

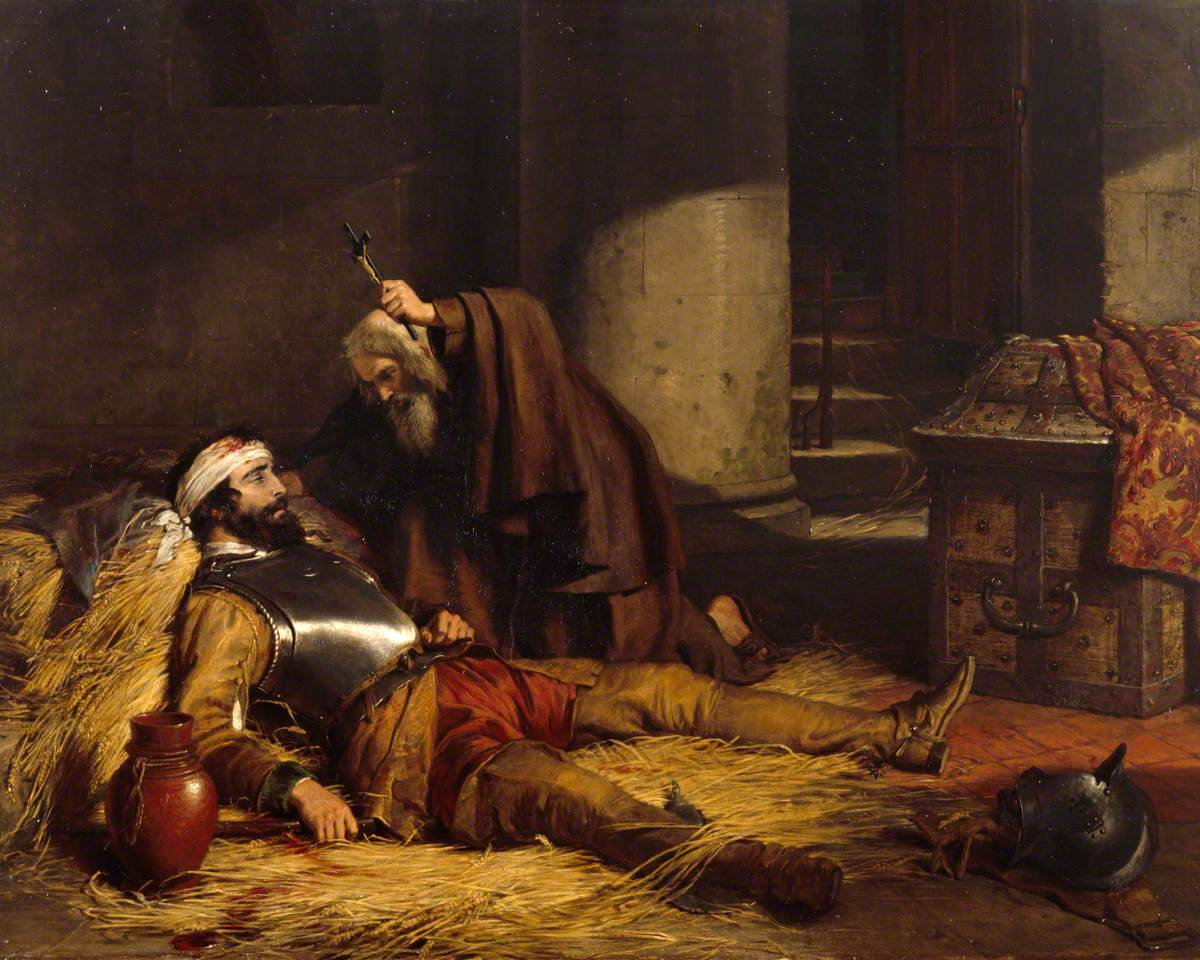
- Artist: Charles Landseer
- Year: 1843
- Type: Oil on canvas, history painting
- Dimensions: 80.2 cm × 100.3 cm (31.6 in × 39.5 in)
- Location: Royal Academy of Arts; London

The Dying Warrior is an 1843 history painting by the British artist Charles Landseer. It depicts a scene where a fatally wounded soldier clad in armour is read the last rites by a priest. It was inspired by the themes of the Romantic writer Walter Scott, and was initially exhibited with a quote from Scott's 1831 novel Castle Dangerous.

Landseer was the son of the engraver John Landseer and the elder brother of the celebrated animal painter Edwin Landseer. He displayed this work at the annual exhibition of the British Institution held in Pall Mall in 1843. Two years later when he was elected as a full member of the Royal Academy of Arts he was expected to submit a diploma work and chose to present this painting. It has some slight thematic similarities with his brother Edwin's own The Faithful Hound.

== Bibliography ==
- Gordon, Catherine May. The Lamp of Memory. Derbyshire Museum Service, 1979.
- Neher, Allister. Art and Anatomy in Nineteenth Century Britain. Cambridge Scholars Publishing, 2022.
