= Jessica Landseer =

British painter and etcher

Jessica Landseer (1810–1880) was an English landscape and miniature painter. She exhibited from 1816 to around 1838; then stopped while she kept house for her brother, Edwin Landseer. She continued to paint, however, and resumed exhibiting in 1863, while still caring for Edwin, who was in bad health in the last years of his life.

== Life ==
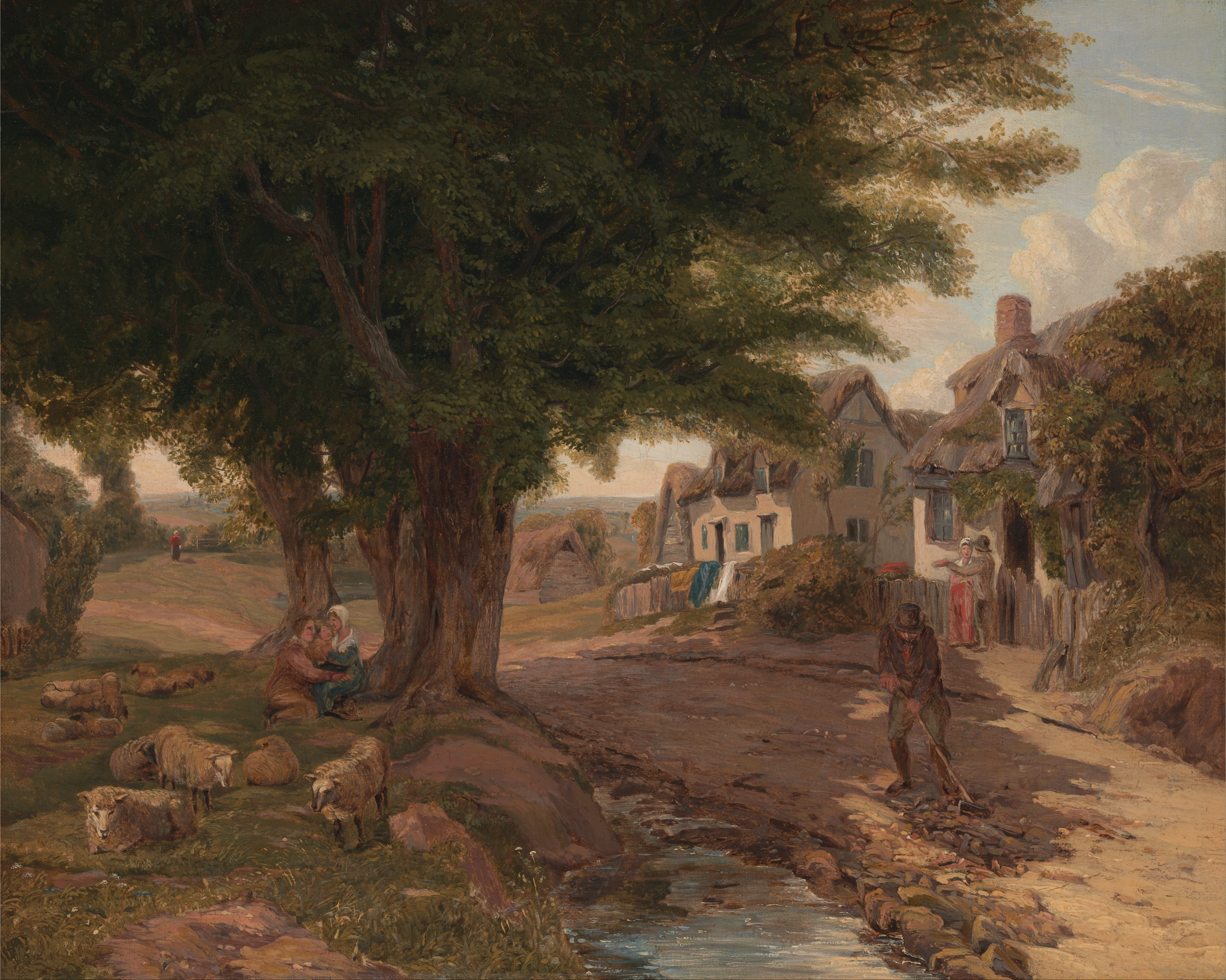
Village Scene (1817) by Jessica Landseer

Born, according to her own statement, on 29 January 1810, Jessica Landseer was the daughter of Jane Potts and John Landseer. Between 1816 and 1866 she exhibited ten pictures at the Royal Academy, seven at the British Institution, and six at the Suffolk Street Gallery. She also etched plates after her brother Edwin—Vixen, a Scottish Terrier (also engraved by her brother Thomas Landseer); and Lady Louisa Russell feeding a Donkey (1826).

It was at the Society of Female Artists, almost exclusively, that Jessica Landseer exhibited after 1863. Her brother, whom she had nursed, died in 1873, leaving her a substantial legacy, and she moved to Kensington Park Gardens, with a carriage.

Jessica Landseer did not marry. She died at Folkestone on 29 August 1880. She left money to animal charities.

== Notes ==
Attribution

This article incorporates text from a publication now in the public domain: Lee, Sidney, ed. (1892). "Landseer, Jessica". Dictionary of National Biography. Vol. 32. London: Smith, Elder & Co.
