= Maria (painting) =

Painting by Charles Landseer

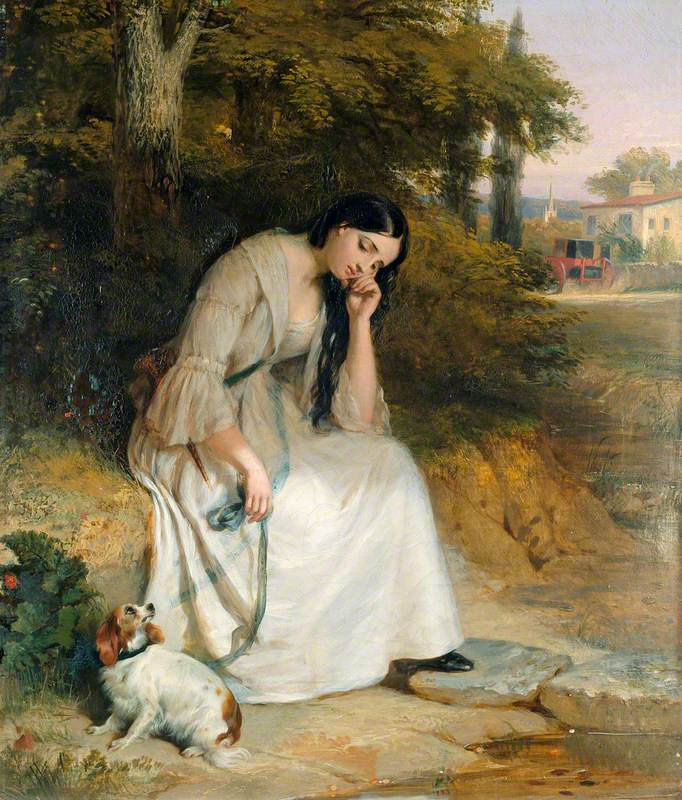
- Artist: Charles Landseer
- Year: 1836
- Type: Oil on canvas, genre painting
- Dimensions: 55.9 cm × 46.9 cm (22.0 in × 18.5 in)
- Location: Victoria and Albert Museum; London

Maria is an 1836 oil painting by the English artist Charles Landseer. It is inspired by a passage in the 1768 novel A Sentimental Journey Through France and Italy by the Anglo-Irish author Laurence Sterne. It depicts Maria, a mournful young woman left disconsolate by her husband's death. She is accompanied by a small dog.

The painting was displayed at the 1836 exhibition of the British Institution, held at Pall Mall. It was purchased by John Sheepshanks, a noted collector of contemporary British art, who in 1857 donated it to the new Victoria and Albert Museum in South Kensington as part of the Sheepshanks Gift.

== Bibliography ==
- Gerard, W.B. Laurence Sterne and the Visual Imagination. Taylor & Francis, 2016.
- Gordon, Katherine May. British Paintings of Subjects from the English Novel, 1740-1870. Garland, 1988.
- Roe, Sonia. Oil Paintings in Public Ownership in the Victoria and Albert Museum. Public Catalogue Foundation, 2008.
