= George Landseer =

English painter (1829–1878)

George Landseer (1829–1878 London) was a British painter.

He was the nephew of Sir Edwin Henry Landseer and his father Thomas Landseer was also an artist. He studied at the Royal Academy Schools in 1846 and exhibited at the Royal Academy from 1850 until 1858 before establishing a practice in India painting landscapes and portraits in oil and watercolour.

He returned to England in about 1870 and gave up painting due to poor health. He died in 1878 and was buried on the western side of Highgate Cemetery. His grave (no.22280) has no headstone or memorial.

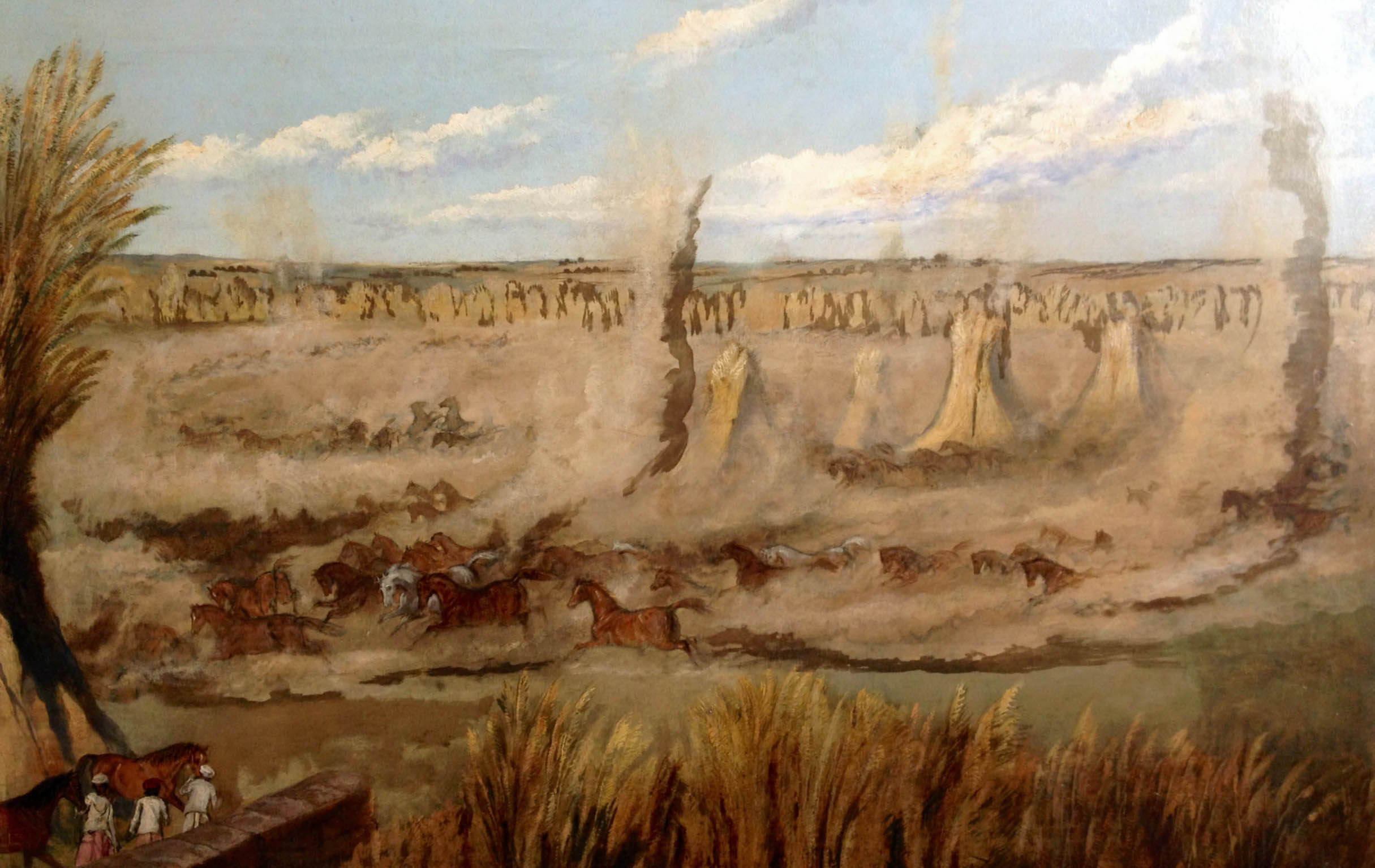
The Foal run, Buxar, India
