= Landser =

Landser may refer to:

- A German colloquial term for a German army soldier, particularly used during World War II
- Landser (band), a German Neo-Nazi band
- Der Landser, a German pulp magazine published weekly from 1957 through 2013, featuring stories in a World War II setting
- Landser, Haut-Rhin, a town in Alsace, France

== See also ==
- Landseer (disambiguation)
