= Thomas Landseer =

British artist (1795–1880)

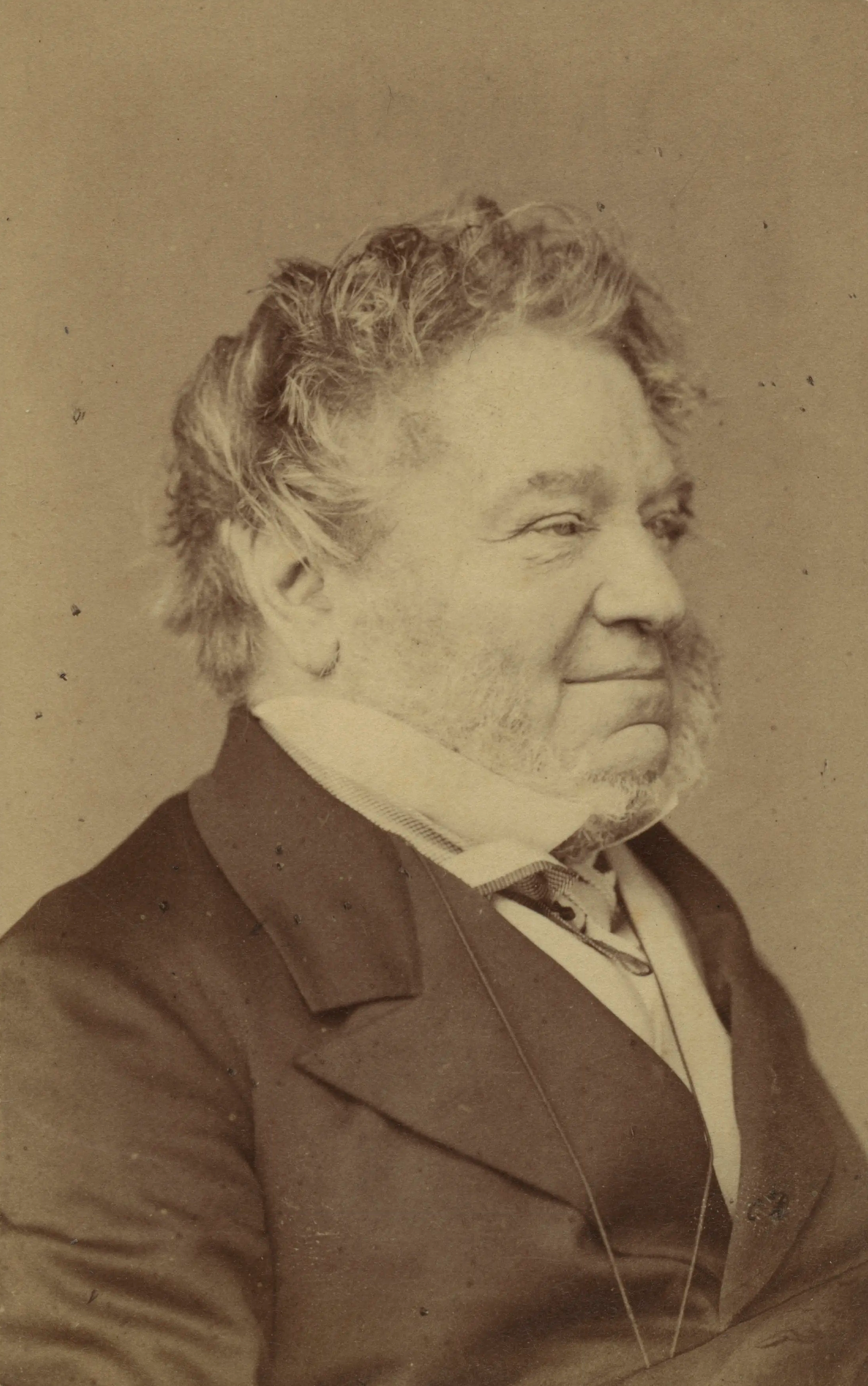
Carte-de-visite by Elliott & Fry, 1860s

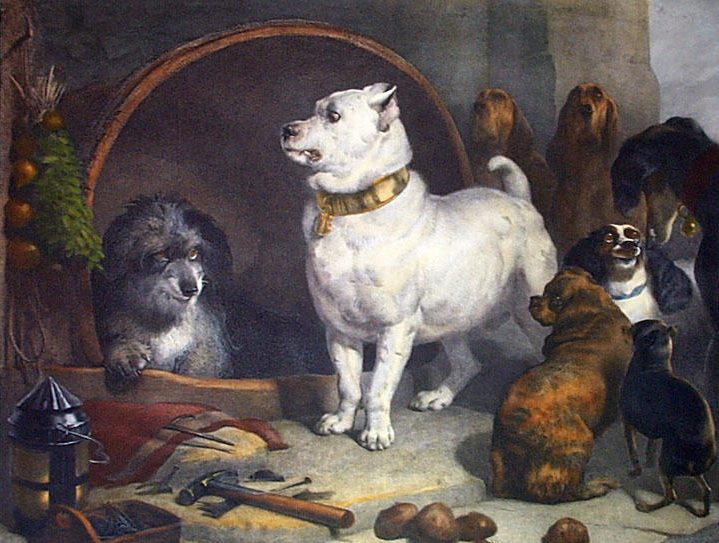
Hand-coloured engraving by Thomas Landseer, after the painting Alexander and Diogenes by Sir Edwin Landseer c. 1850.

Thomas Landseer ARA (1795 – 20 January 1880) was a British artist best known for his engravings and etchings, particularly those of paintings by his youngest brother Edwin Landseer.

== Life ==
Landseer was born in London, the eldest of the fourteen children of actress Jane Potts and engraver John Landseer. Seven of the children survived to adulthood and all became artists; his younger brothers were painters and later Royal Academicians Charles Landseer and Edwin Landseer. Like his father, Thomas was deaf. He was the only sibling to marry, his wife's name was Belinda. His son George Landseer became a portrait and landscape painter.

Like his siblings, Landseer was taught artistic techniques by his father. He then studied under painter Benjamin Robert Haydon alongside his brother Charles and William Bewick. He began etching aged 14, copying his precocious brother's drawings. Thomas continued to make etched copies of Edwin's works in later life, including Dignity and Impudence (1841), Alexander and Diogenes (1852), The Monarch of the Glen (1852) and, his last work, The Font (1875). His soft-ground etchings complimented his brother's animal paintings, and sales of the popular prints (retailing for between 3 and 10 guineas) contributed to his brother's fame and fortune. He assisted his brother with giving art lessons to Queen Victoria and Prince Albert.

Landseer produced satirical etchings of monkeys in human clothing for Monkeyana, or, Men in Miniature (1827), and dedicated his Characteristic Sketches of Animals (1832) to the Zoological Society. He also produced illustrations for Samuel Taylor Coleridge's Devil's Walk (1831). He also exhibited paintings at the British Institution and the Royal Academy. He was elected an associate of the Royal Academy in 1867 for his etchings. He edited a biography of William Bewick published in 1871.

He died at 11 Grove End Road, St. John's Wood, on 20 January 1880. He was buried at Highgate Cemetery.
