= Ælfric Bata =

English monk (fl. 1005)

Ælfric Bata (fl. 1005) was an English monk and a disciple of Ælfric of Eynsham at Winchester some time before 1005. The epithet Bata is unclear; the formerly accepted interpretation "the bat" has been rejected, and Tengvik suggests it means 'stout'.

From the Oxford MS of Ælfric of Eynsham's Colloquium (St John's College, Oxford 154) it appears that Ælfric Bata added something to this work composed by his master, and, as the Grammar and Glossary of Grammaticus are combined in that manuscript with the Colloquium, it is likely that Bata edited the whole collection. It has been supposed that some of the writings attributed to the master were the work of the disciple. Bata's original writings are preserved in that Oxford MS: a set of conversations ("colloquies"), designed to teach communication skills in Latin to young students; and the Colloquia difficiliora ("more difficult colloquies"), dialogues or monologues in difficult Latin, evidently meant to be delivered as declamations. For his colloquies, Bata made use of the seminal collection De raris fabulis. He is described by Tracey-Anne Cooper as "the Canterbury schoolmaster and colloquist".

== Editions ==
- Aelfrici Colloquium, in Analecta Anglo-saxonica: Selections, in Prose and Verse, from the Anglo-Saxon Literature, with an Introductory Ethnological Essay, and Notes, Critical and Explanatory by Louis F. Klipstein, Volume I (New York: Putnam, 1849), pp. 195-214
- Gwara, Scott; Porter, David W. (1997). Anglo-Saxon Conversations: The Colloquies of Ælfric Bata. Woodbridge, Suffolk: Boydell Press. ISBN 978-0851156996.
