= De raris fabulis =

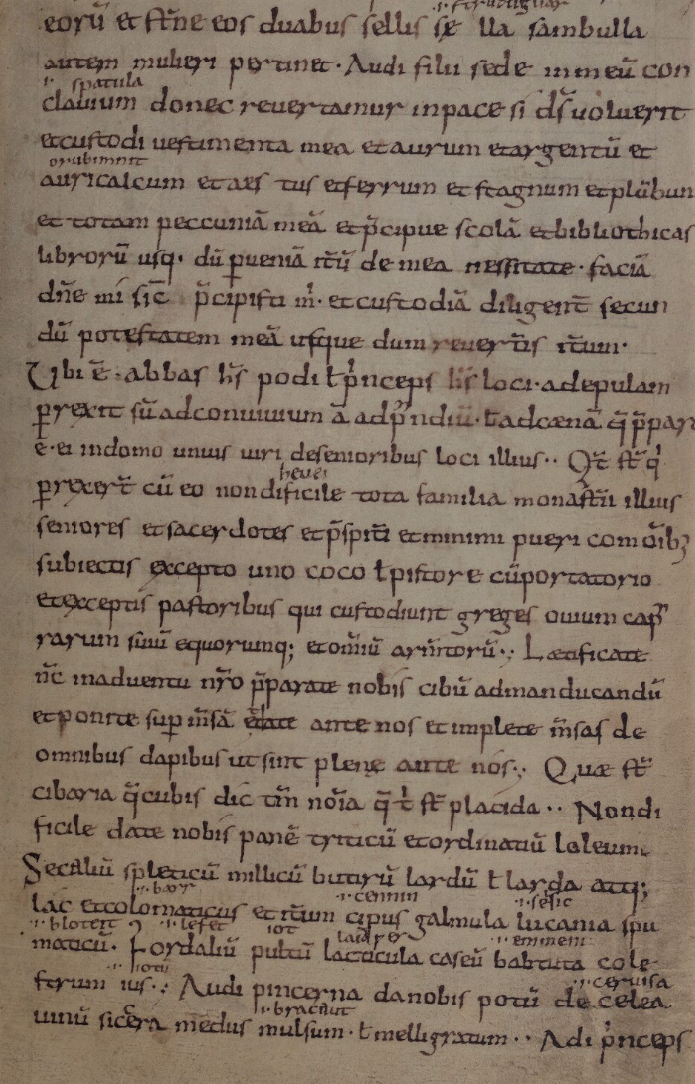
Page from De raris fabulis, with interlinear glosses clearly visible

De raris fabulis ("On uncommon tales", "On curious tales" or "On rare expressions") is a collection of 23 or 24 short Latin dialogues from 9th- or 10th-century Celtic Britain. The dialogues belong to the genre known as the colloquy. These were pedagogical texts for teaching Latin in monastic schools.

De raris fabulis survives in a single manuscript, the Later Oxford Codex (Codex Oxoniensis Posterior), now Oxford, Bodleian Library MS Bodley 572 (SC 2026), at folios 41v–47r. The manuscript was produced in Cornwall, and dates to the second quarter of the 10th century. The script is Anglo-Caroline. The text itself may have been composed in the 9th century in Wales. The manuscript was in Winchester by the 11th century (and possibly as early as the late 10th), and by the end of the 11th century was at St Augustine's Abbey in Canterbury. The unascetic nature of monastic living implied by the dialogues and a reference to a probably fictitious victory of the Britons over the Saxons situate De raris in a Celtic context. Based on its terminology, it has even been suggested that it originated in Brittany and subsequently passed through Wales to Cornwall, acquiring distinct features along the way.

De raris fabulis consists of 23 or 24 distinct conversations. Their purpose was teaching spoken Latin to monastic oblates. For this reason they mostly concern daily life in a monastic environment, although there are also references to trade and pilgrimage. The text may be a combination of two earlier sets of colloquies. In structure, the dialogues typically contain questions and answers with strings of vocabulary to choose from, e.g., "Ring the bell because the hour called 'midnight' is here, or dawn or cockcrow or dusk or matins or prime or terce or midday or none or twilight or vespers." In practice, the oblates would select the appropriate word from the list.

De raris fabulis contains around 200 vernacular glosses in Old Cornish, Old Welsh and Old English. There are both interlinear glosses and glosses that have been incorporated into the main text. While the Celtic glosses were originally read as Cornish, some of them are indisputably Welsh and the rest could be either. The two languages are not easily distinguished for the 9th century. Joseph Loth argued that the text may have originated in an area intermediate between Wales and Cornwall, such as Gloucestershire or Somerset, but Kenneth Jackson argued that these areas were already English-speaking in the 9th century. He argued instead that the glosses were the work of either "a Cornishman in Wales, or a Welshman in Cornwall". The only Old English glosses were scratched into the parchment with a stylus, but not inked. The text also shows certain Hiberno-Latin features, but no direct connection with Ireland can be made.

De raris fabulis contains several notable literary references. One line—"don't stand between me and the light"—is derived from the story of Diogenes and Alexander, probably through the account of Valerius Maximus. Its meaning, however, is not entirely clear, suggesting a misunderstanding at some point in the transmission. A proverb (#14) from the probably Irish Proverbia Grecorum is also quoted, which probably reflects the independent transmission of this text in Wales. Although King Arthur is not named in the De raris fabulis, its account of a war between Britons and Saxons may depend on oral legends within the Arthurian tradition.

De raris fabulis was edited into a new set of colloquies, Colloquia e libro De raris fabulis retractata, which was used by Ælfric Bata as a source for his own colloquies. The line from the Diogenes story is further garbled in Bata.

== Bibliography ==
=== Editions ===
- Stokes, Whitley (1860–1861). "Cambrica". Transactions of the Philological Society. 7: 204–249, 288–293. (at pp. 238–249)
- Stevenson, W. H., ed. (1929). "De raris fabulis". Early Scholastic Colloquies. Clarendon Press. pp. 1–10.
- Gwara, Scott, ed. (2004). De Raris Fabulis, "On Uncommon Tales": A Glossed Latin Colloquy-Text From a Tenth-Century Cornish Manuscript. University of Cambridge, Department of Anglo-Saxon, Norse & Celtic.

=== Secondary literature ===
- Charles-Edwards, T. M. (2013). Wales and the Britons, 350–1064. Oxford University Press.
- Dumville, David N. (1992). "A Thesaurus Palaeoanglicus? The Celtic Experience". In René Derolez (ed.). Anglo-Saxon Glossography. Koninklijke Acad?mie voor Wetenschappen. pp. 59–76.
- Falileyev, Alexander (2006). "De raris fabulis". In John C. Koch (ed.). Celtic Culture: A Historical Encyclopedia. ABC-CLIO. pp. 575–577.
- Gwara, Scott (2004a). "Diogenes the Cynic in the Scholastic Dialogues Called De raris fabulis". American Notes and Queries. 17 (1): 3–6. ProQuest 216723529
- Gwara, Scott (2007). "A Possible Arthurian Epitome in a Tenth-Century Manuscript from Cornwall". Arthuriana. 17 (2): 3–9. doi:10.1353/art.2007.0000. JSTOR 27870833.
- Gwara, Scott (2017). "Colloquies". The Encyclopedia of Medieval Literature in Britain. Wiley. pp. 1–3. doi:10.1002/9781118396957.wbemlb106. ISBN 978-1-118-39698-8.
- Hall, Thomas N. (2009). "Ælfric as Pedagogue". In Hugh Magennis; Mary Swan (eds.). A Companion to Ælfric. Brill. pp. 193–216.
- Wright, Charles D. (2006). "The Prouerbia Grecorum, the Norman Anonymous, and the Early Medieval Ideology of Kingship: Some New Manuscript Evidence". In G. Wieland; C. Ruff; R. G. Arthur (eds.). Insignis Sophiae Arcator: Essays in Honour of Michael W. Herren on his 65th Birthday. Publications of the Journal of Medieval Latin. Vol. 6. Brepols. pp. 193–215. doi:10.1484/m.pjml-eb.6.09070802050003050104020503. ISBN 978-2-503-51425-3.
