= Charles Hoole =

English cleric and educational writer

Charles Hoole (1610–1667) was an English cleric and educational writer. He produced a visually-improved English translation of the Orbis Pictus of Comenius, a year after its original publication in 1658.

== Life ==
The son of Charles Hoole of Wakefield in Yorkshire, he was born there. He was educated at Wakefield free school, and at Lincoln College, Oxford, where he proceeded B.A. on 12 June 1634 and M.A. on 7 July 1636. Robert Sanderson, a relative, helped him get a place at Oxford, and continued through life to support him.

Hoole took holy orders around 1632, and through the influence of Sanderson was appointed master of Rotherham free school. He became rector of Great Ponton, Lincolnshire in 1642, at the outbreak of the First English Civil War but was sequestrated from the living by Parliament.

Moving to London, Hoole made a reputation as a teacher. He taught at private schools, in a house near Maidenhead Court in Aldersgate Street, and in Tokenhouse Gardens in Lothbury.

After the Restoration, Sanderson became bishop of Lincoln, made Hoole his chaplain, and looked to give him preferment. On 10 December 1660 he became rector of Stock, Essex, and held the position until his death there on 7 March 1667. He was buried in the chancel of his parish church.

== Works ==
Hoole wrote popular educational works, some published after his death:

- An Easy Entrance to the Latin Tongue, wherein are contained the Grounds of Grammar, a Vocabularie of Common Words, English and Latine, 1649.
- Terminationes et Exempla Declinationum et Conjugationum in usum Grammaticastrorum, 1650, much reprinted; revised edition by Thomas Sandon, 1828; another corrected edition, Dublin, 1857.
- Propria quæ Maribus, Quæ Genus and As in præsenti. Englished and explayned, 1650.
- Lily's Latine Grammar fitted for the use of Schools, 1653.
- Vocabularium parvum Anglo-Latinum. … A little Vocabulary, 1657.
- M. Corderius's School Colloquies, English and Latine. Divided into several clauses, wherein the propriety of both languages is kept, 1657. Based on the Latin textbook of Mathurin Cordier.
- L. Culmann's Sentences for Children … translated into English, 1658. From the Sententiæ pueriles of Leonhard Culmann.
- J. A. Commenii, Orbis Sensualium pictus … translated as "The Visible World", 1659.
- Pueriles Confabulatiunculæ. Children's Talk. English and Latin, 1659.
- Catonis disticha de Moribus, with Dicta septem sapientum Græciæ, 1659. From the Distichs of Cato.
- Comenius, Johann Amos (1887). Bardeen, Charles William (ed.). Orbis Pictus (The Visible World in Pictures). Translated by Hoole, Charles. Syracuse, New York: School Bulletin Publications. OCLC 166163. "gutenberg.org/ebooks/28299"
- Centuria Epistolarum. Anglo-Latinarum, ex Tritissimis Classicis Authoribus … A Century of Epistles, 1660. Based on Cicero, it covers letter composition in both Latin and English.
- New Discovery of the Old Art of Teaching School, 1660.
- Examinatio Grammaticæ Latinæ in usum Scholarum adornatæ, 1660.
- An edition of the New Testament in Greek, 1664.
- P. Terentii Comœdiæ Sex Anglo-Latinæ, 1676.
- The Common Accidence Examined and Explained by Short Questions and Answers, 1679.
- Æsop's Fables. English and Latin, 1700.

== Views on pedagogy ==
For the upper school forms Hoole recommended a rhetoric text, derived from the Rhetorica of Audomarus Talaeus in the edition by Charles Butler. It was the Rhetorices Elementa (1648) of William Dugard. He advocated the traditional approach of having pupils converse in Latin, but it was dying out by the end of his career. Alongside Latin poetry, he introduced pupils to contemporary poetry in English: George Herbert, Francis Quarles, and Ovid in the translation of George Sandys.

== Notes ==
Attribution

This article incorporates text from a publication now in the public domain: Lee, Sidney, ed. (1891). "Hoole, Charles". Dictionary of National Biography. Vol. 27. London: Smith, Elder & Co.
