= Charles Landseer =

English painter

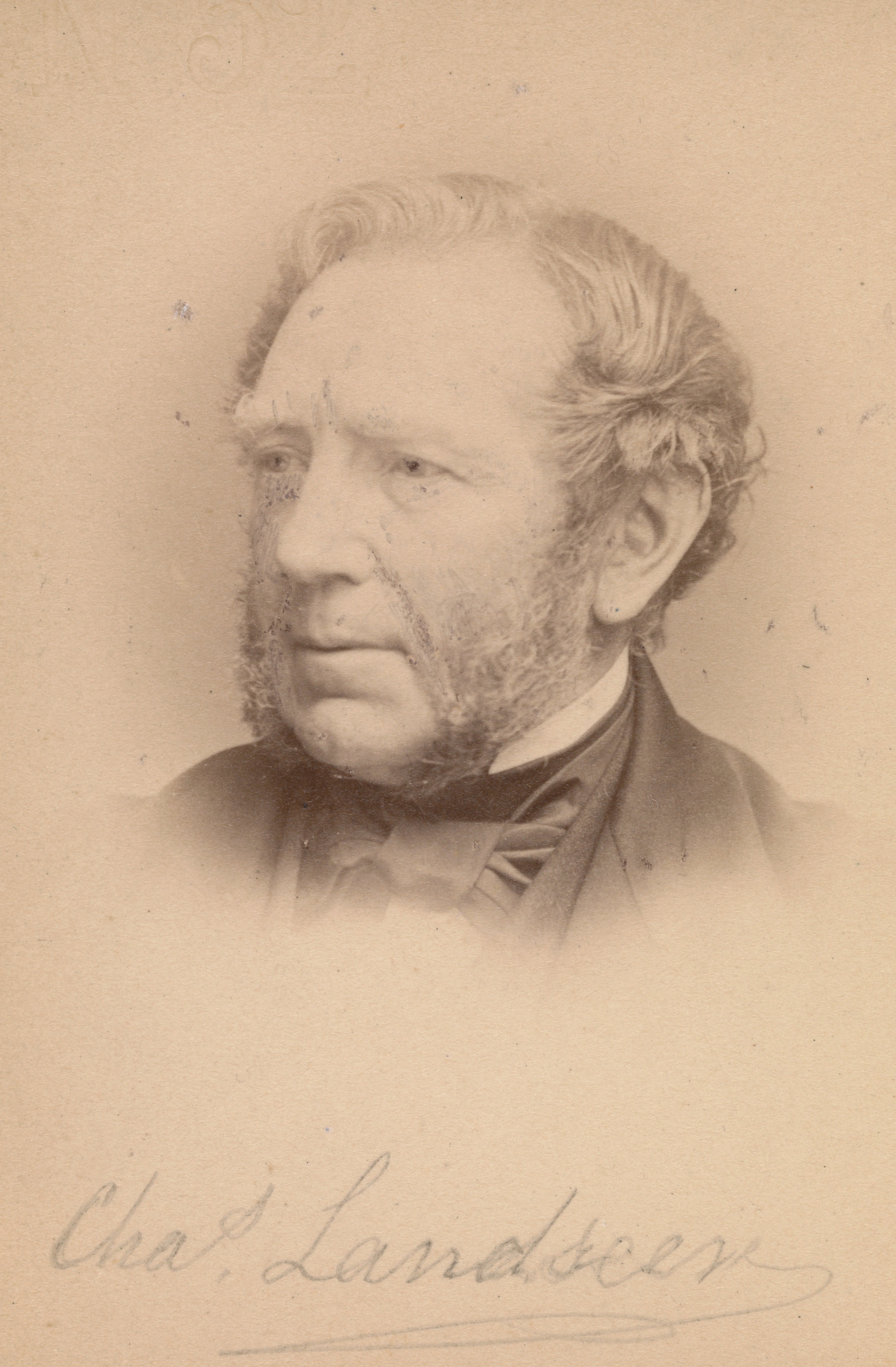
Carte de visite of Landseer in the 1860s

Charles Landseer, RA (12 August 1799 – 22 July 1879) was an English painter who specialised in history painting.

== Life ==
He was born in London on 12 August 1799, the second son of the engraver John Landseer, and the elder brother of the animal painter, Sir Edwin Landseer. He trained under his father, and the painter Benjamin Robert Haydon. He was awarded the silver palette of the Royal Society of Arts for a drawing of Laocoon in 1815, and in 1816 he entered the Royal Academy Schools where he was taught by Henry Fuseli.

In 1823 he accompanied Sir Charles Stuart de Rothesay on a diplomatic mission to Portugal and Brazil. Many of the drawings he made on the journey were shown at the British Institution in 1828.

He became an associate in of the Royal Academy in 1837, and a full academician in 1845. In 1851, he was appointed Keeper of the Royal Academy, a post requiring him to teach in the "Antique School". He remained in the position until 1873.

Most of his pictures were of subjects from British history, or from literature. He paid close attention to the historical accuracy of the accessories and details in his paintings. His works included The Meeting of Charles I. and his Adherents before the Battle of Edgehill, Clarissa Harlowe in the Prison Room of the Sheriff's Office (1833, now in the collection of the Tate Gallery), The Pillaging of a Jew's House in the Reign of Richard I (1839, Tate Gallery) and The Temptation of Andrew Marvel (1841). While under Haydon's instruction he also made a series of detailed anatomical drawings.

He died in London on 22 July 1879 and was buried with his father on the western side of Highgate Cemetery. He left 10,000 guineas to the Royal Academy to fund scholarships.

== Gallery ==
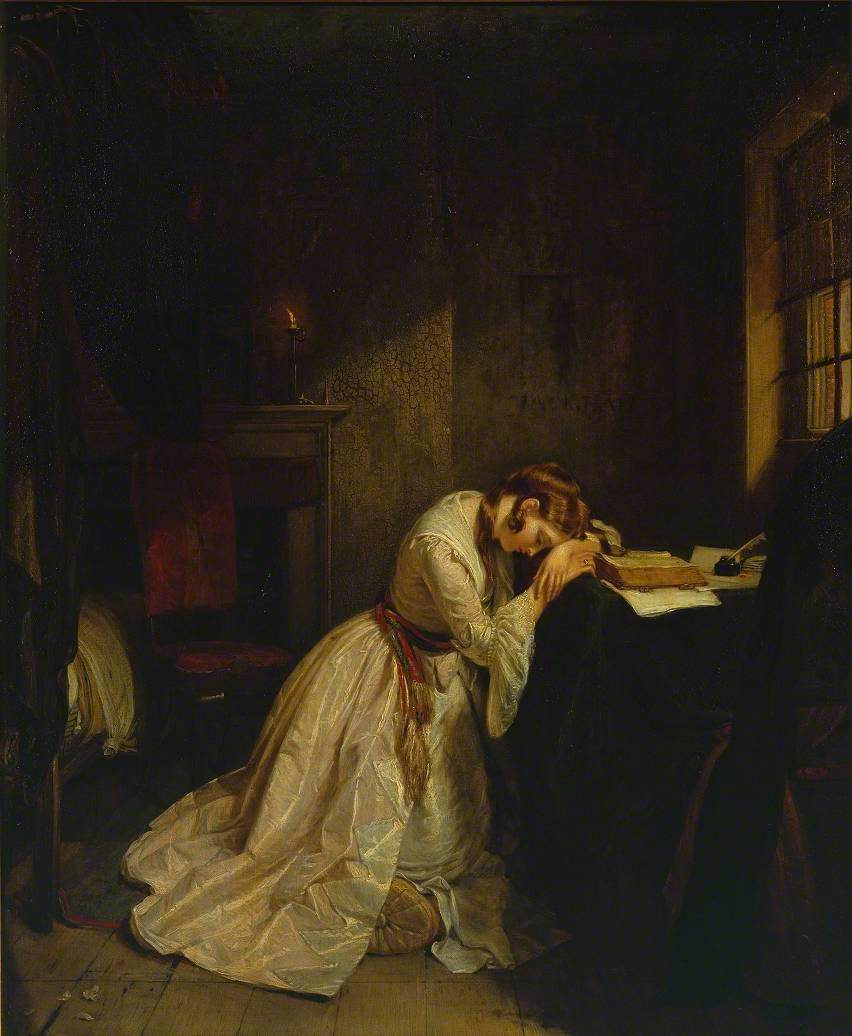
Clarissa Harlowe (1833)

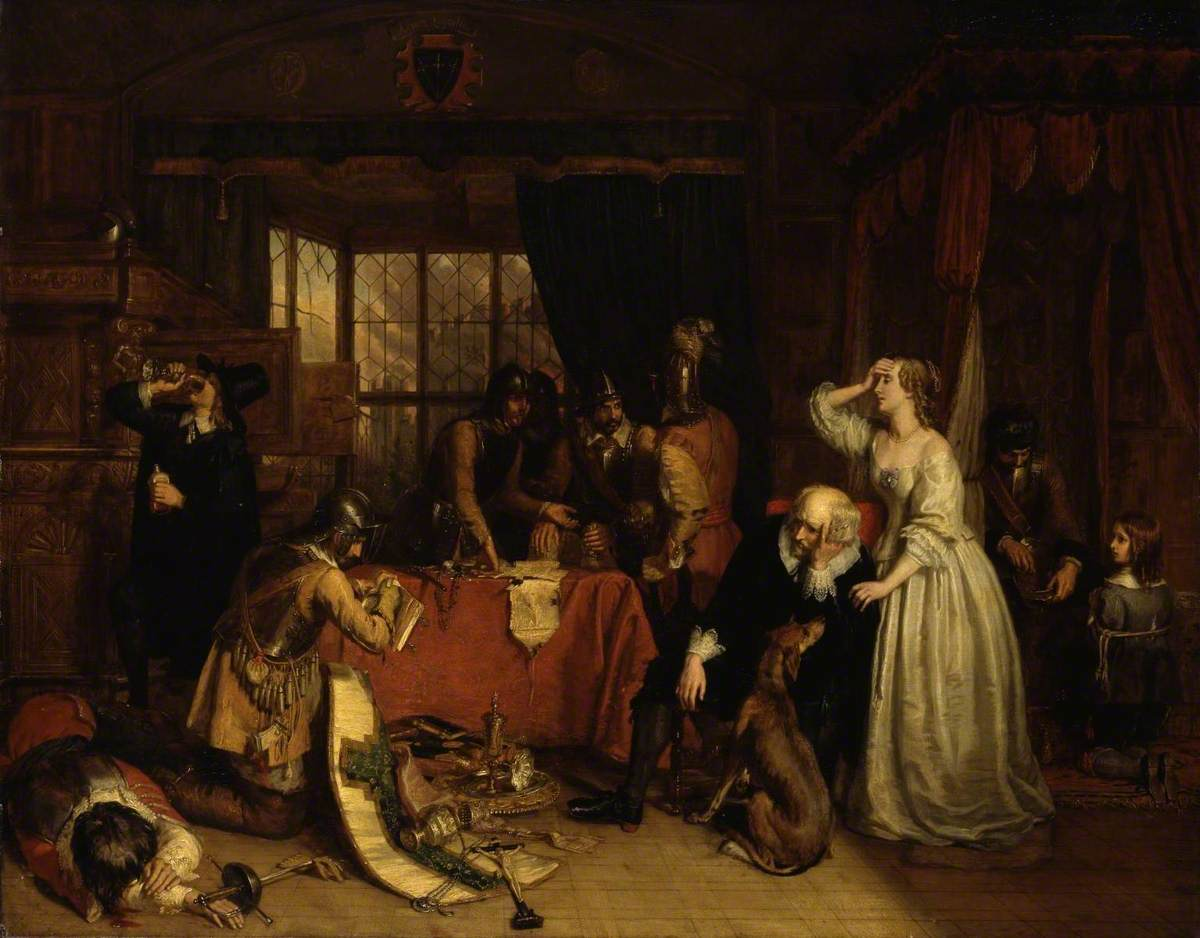
The Plundering of Basing House (1836)

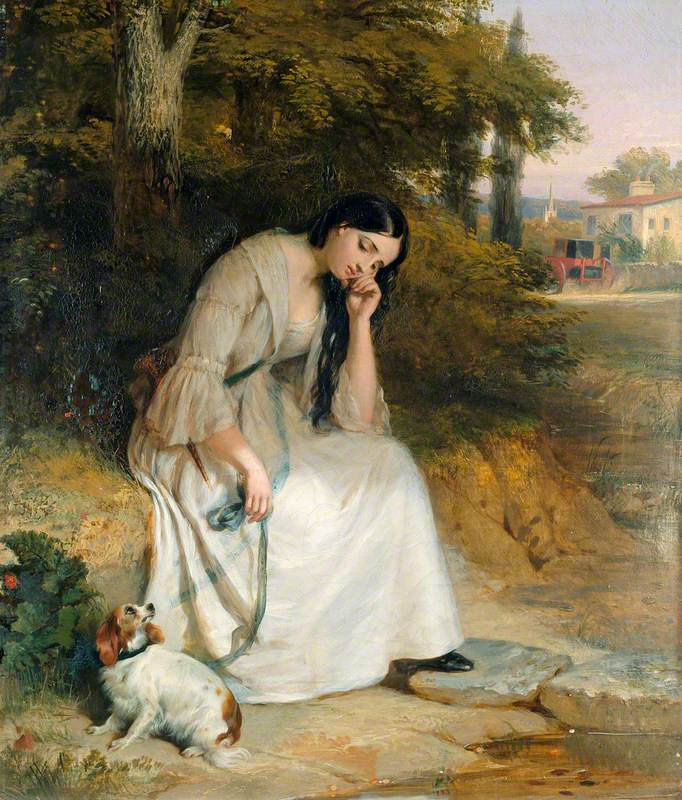
Maria (1836)

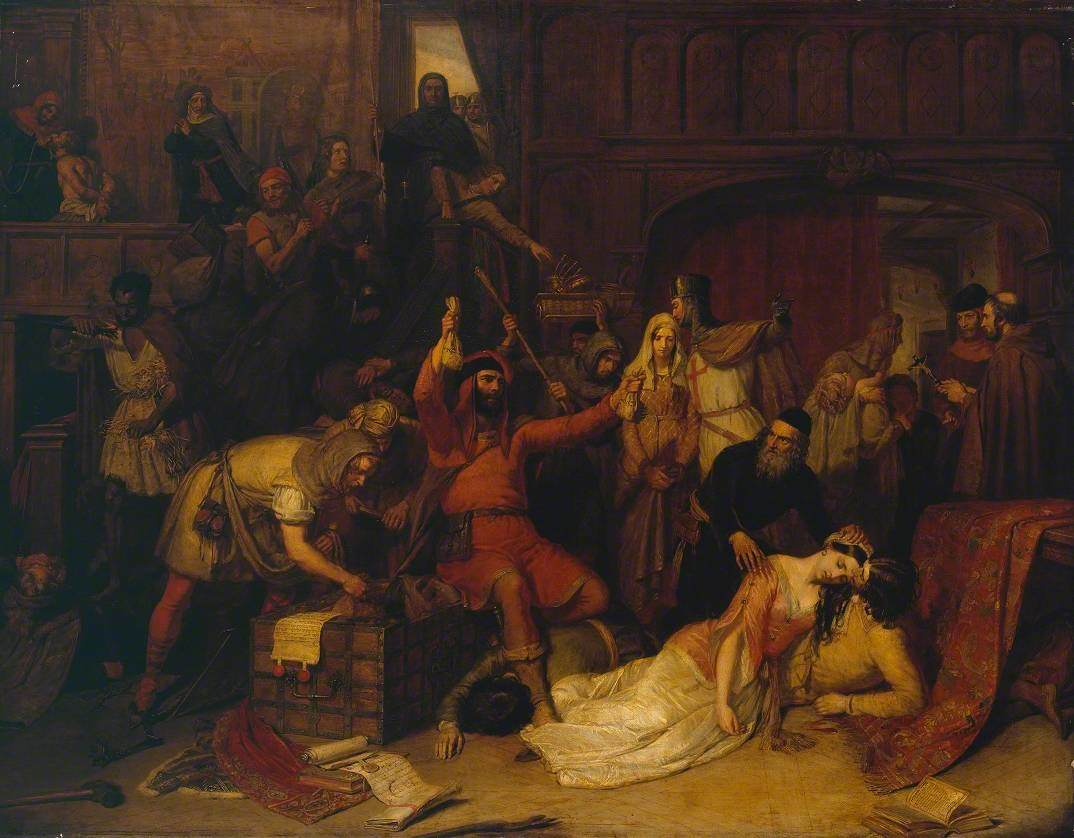
The Pillaging of a Jew's House in the Reign of Richard I (1839)

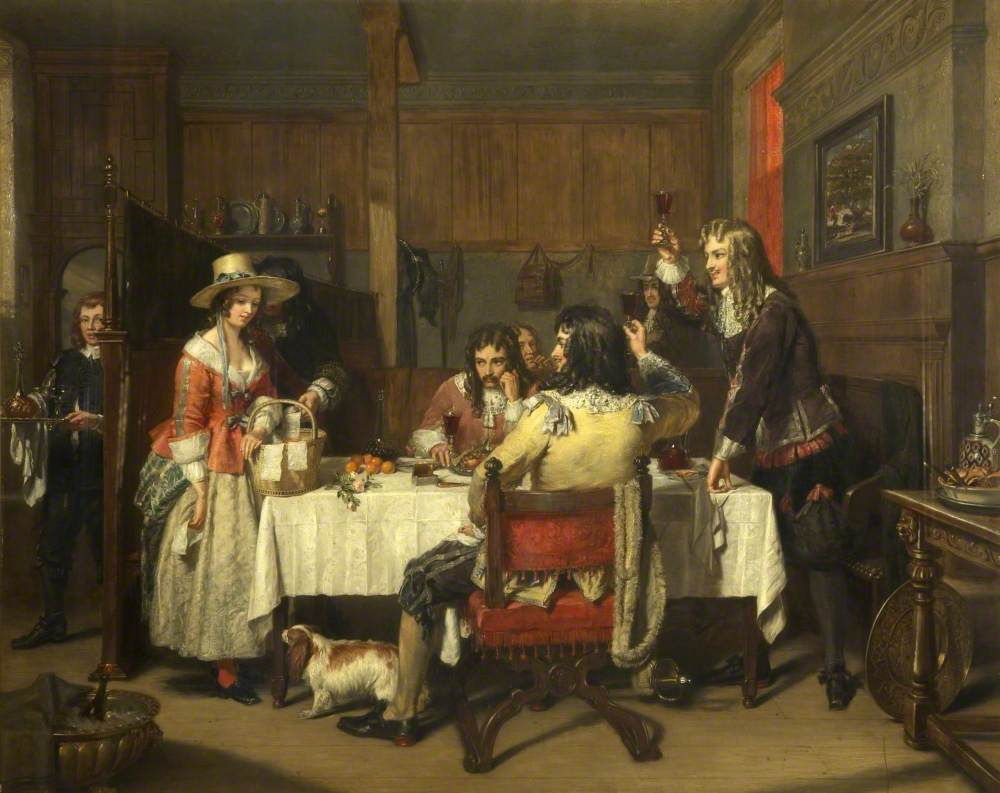
Nell Gwynn at the Tavern (1840)

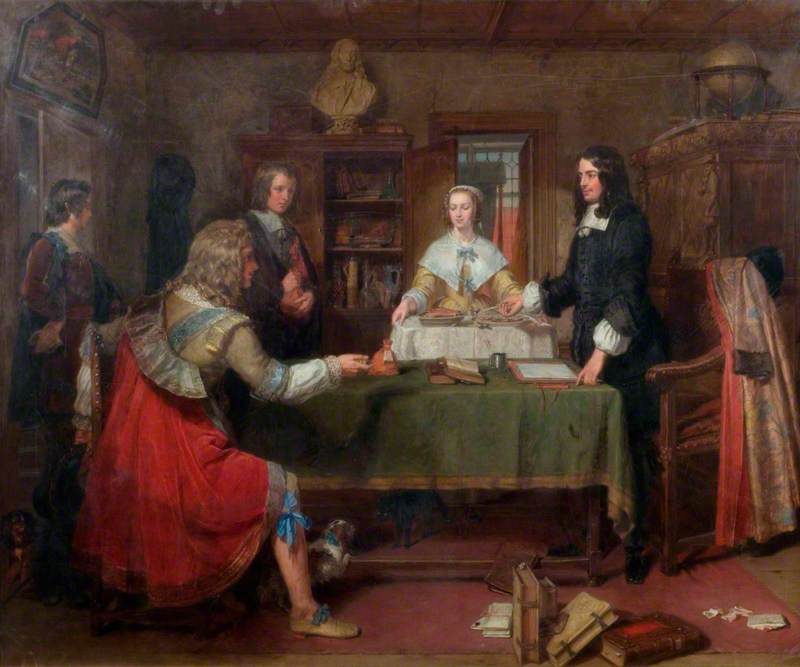
The Temptation of Andrew Marvell (1841)

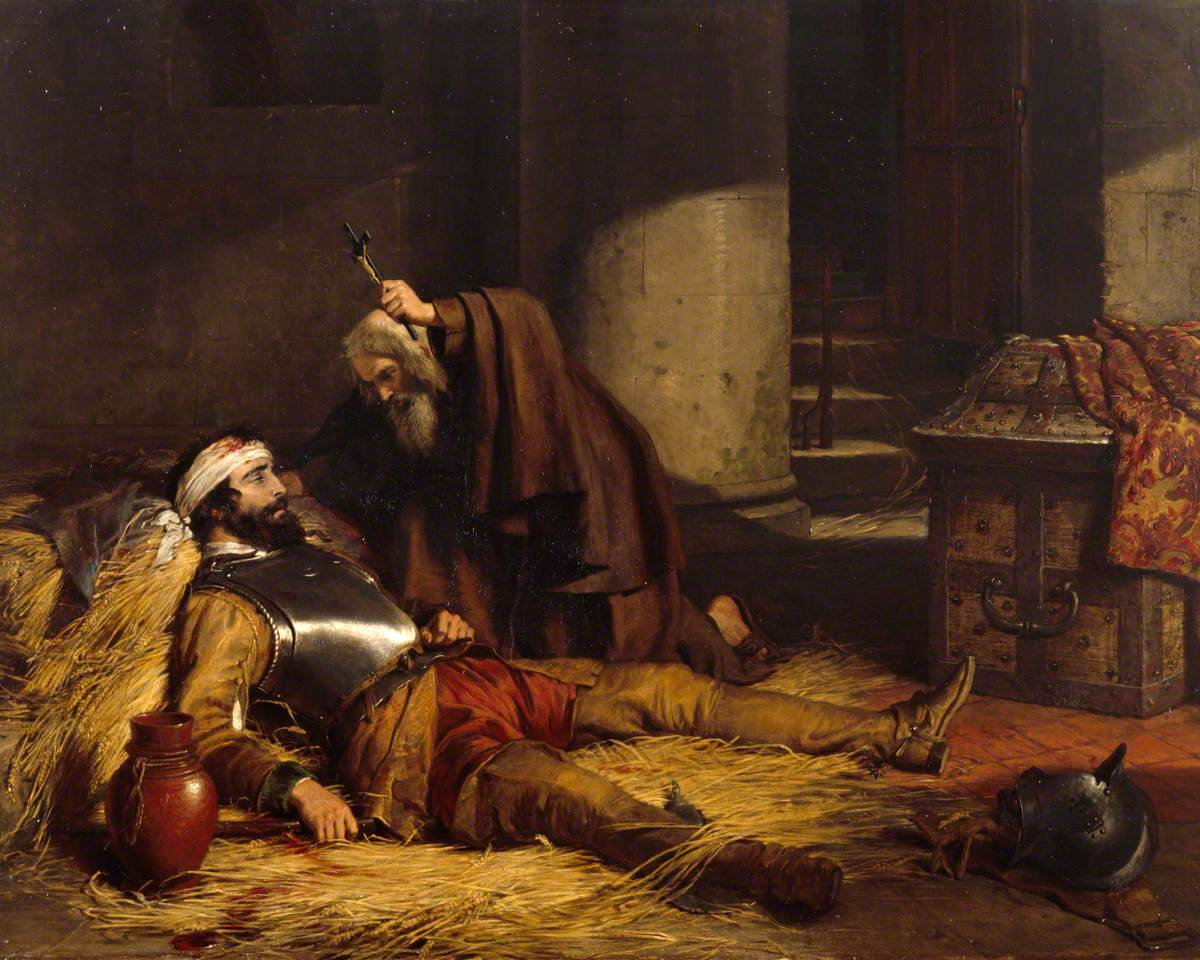
The Dying Warrior (1843)

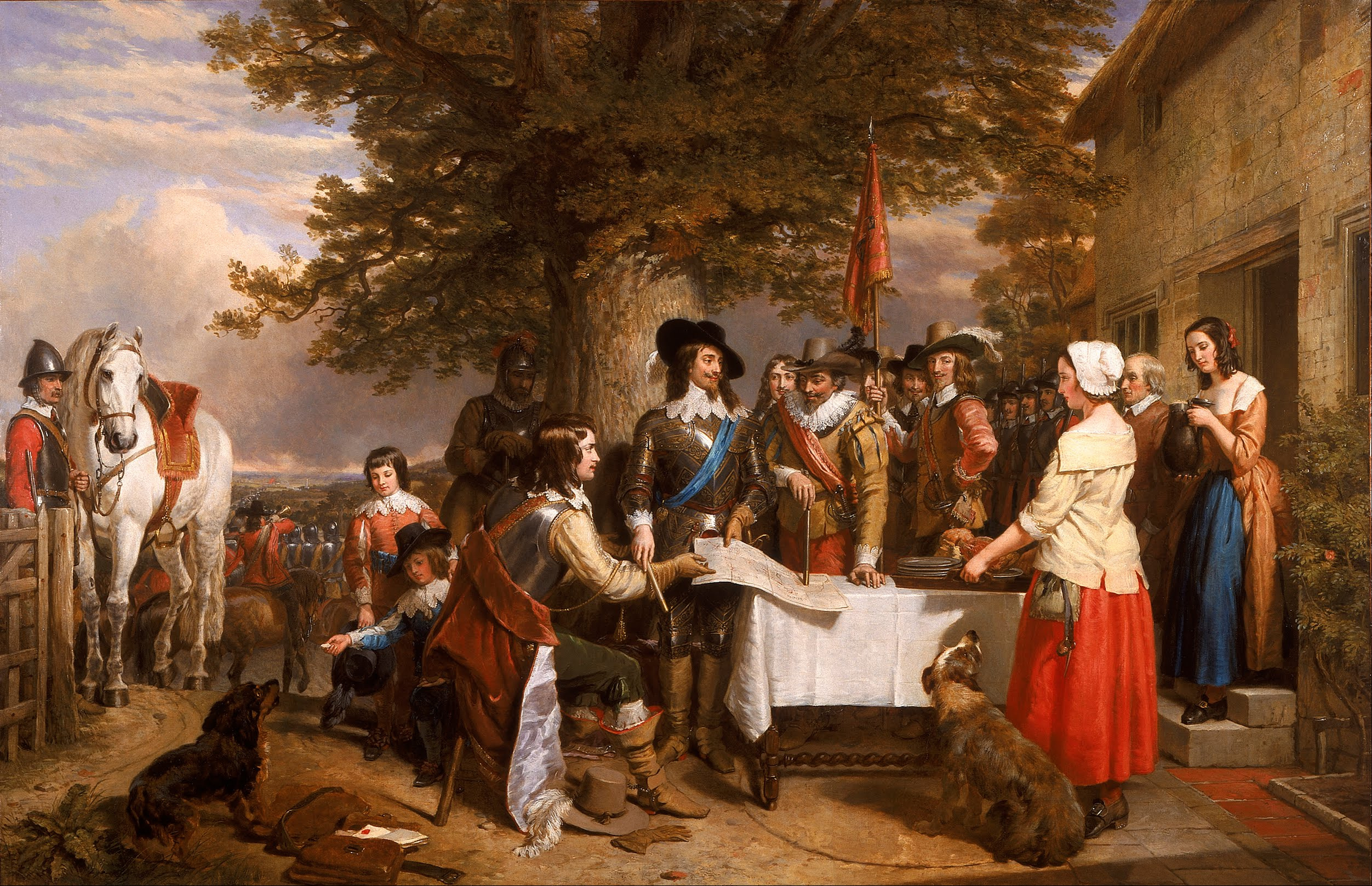
The Eve of the Battle of Edgehill (1845)

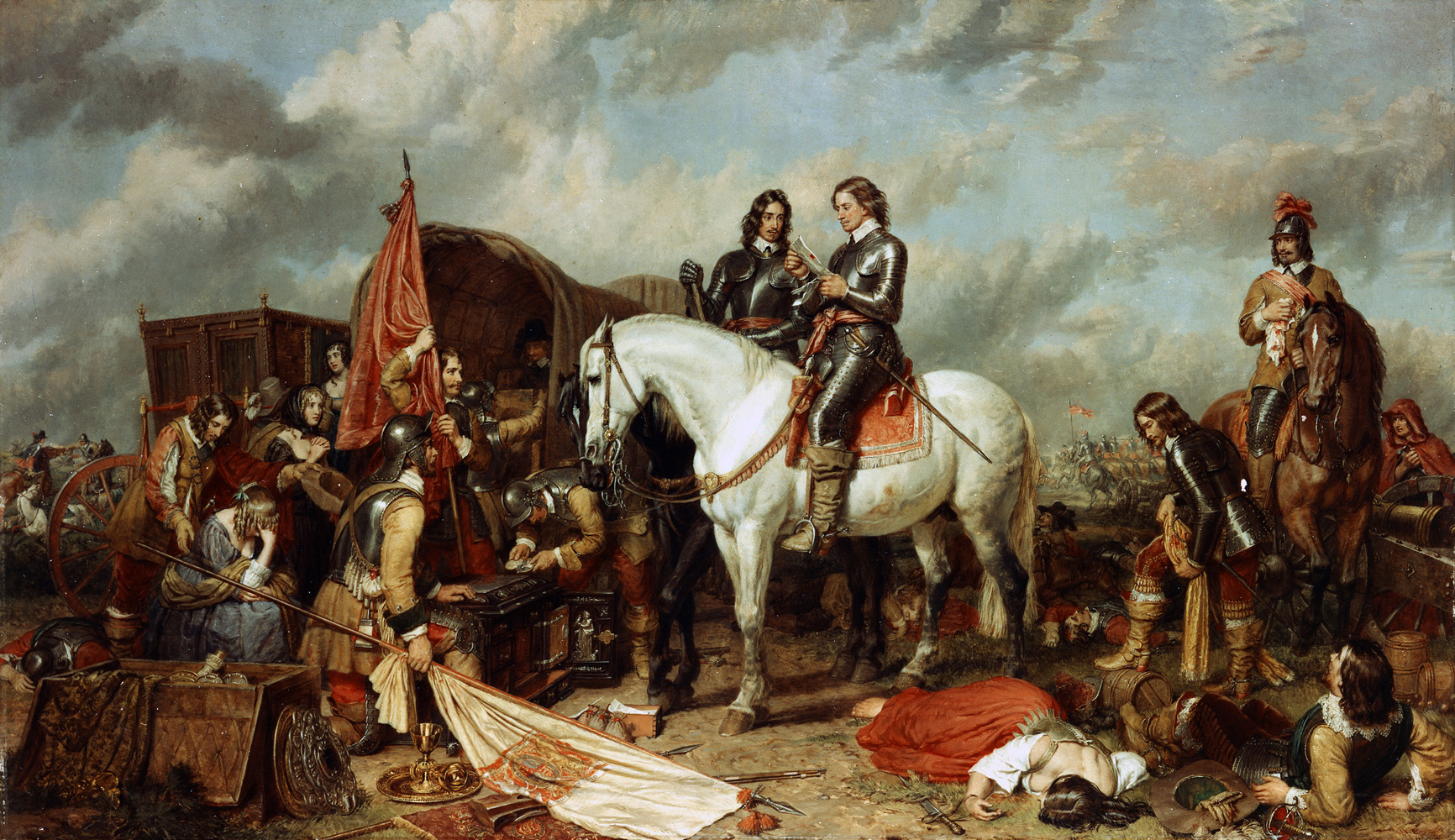
Cromwell at the Battle of Naseby (1851)

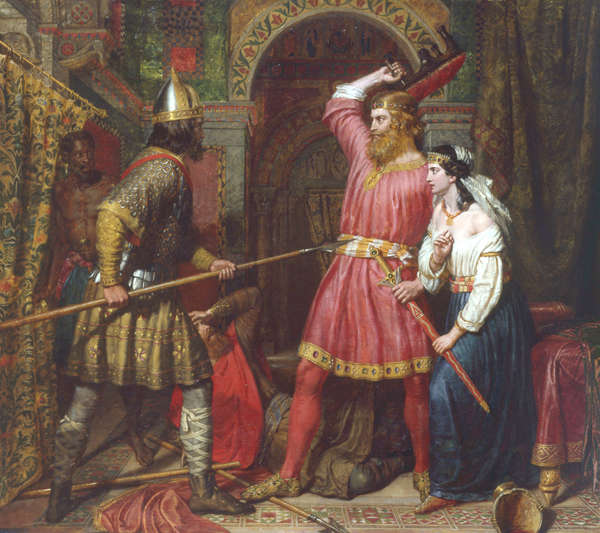
The Assassination of Alboin, King of the Lombards (1856)

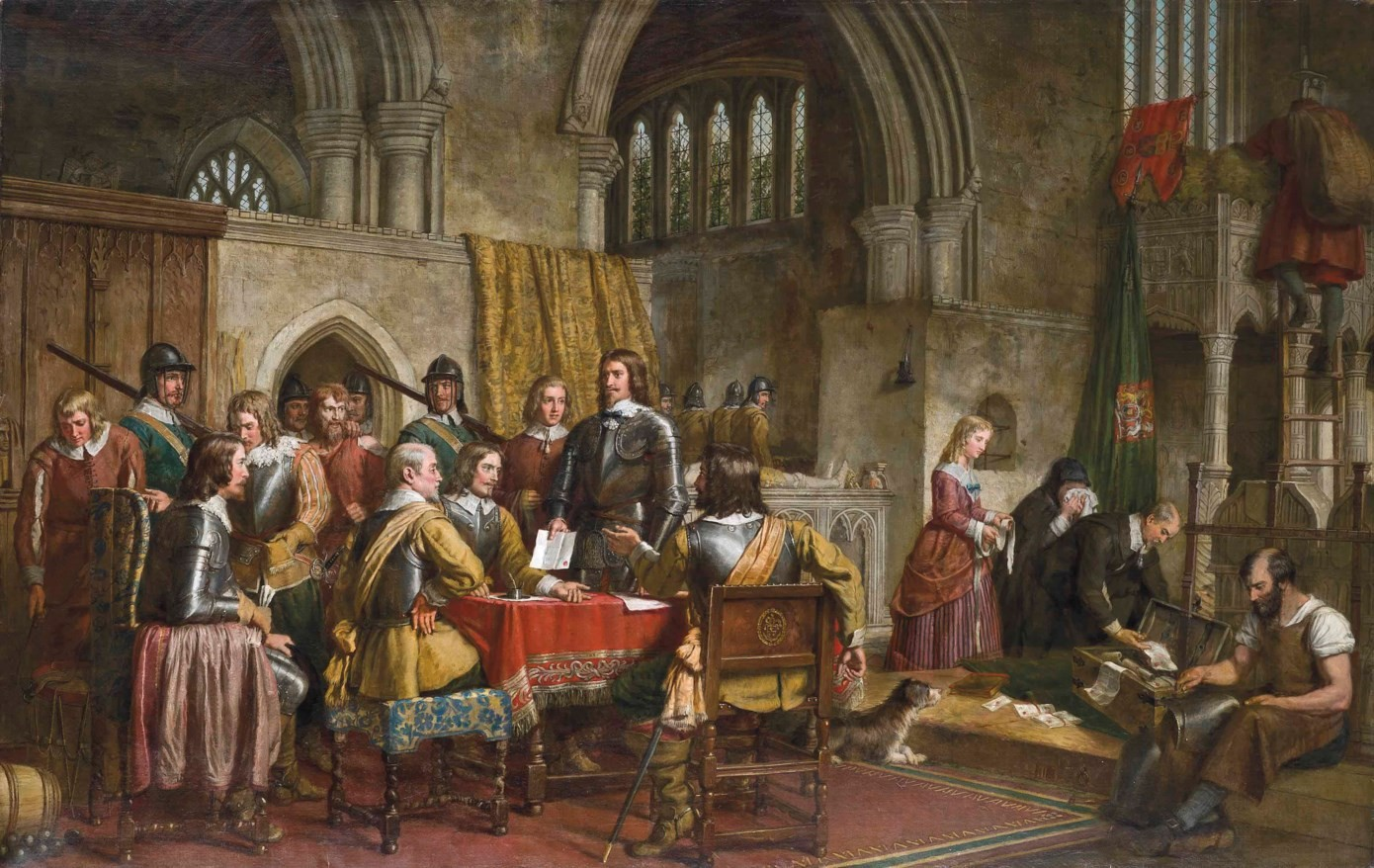
The Surrender of Arundel Castle to Sir William Waller (1870)

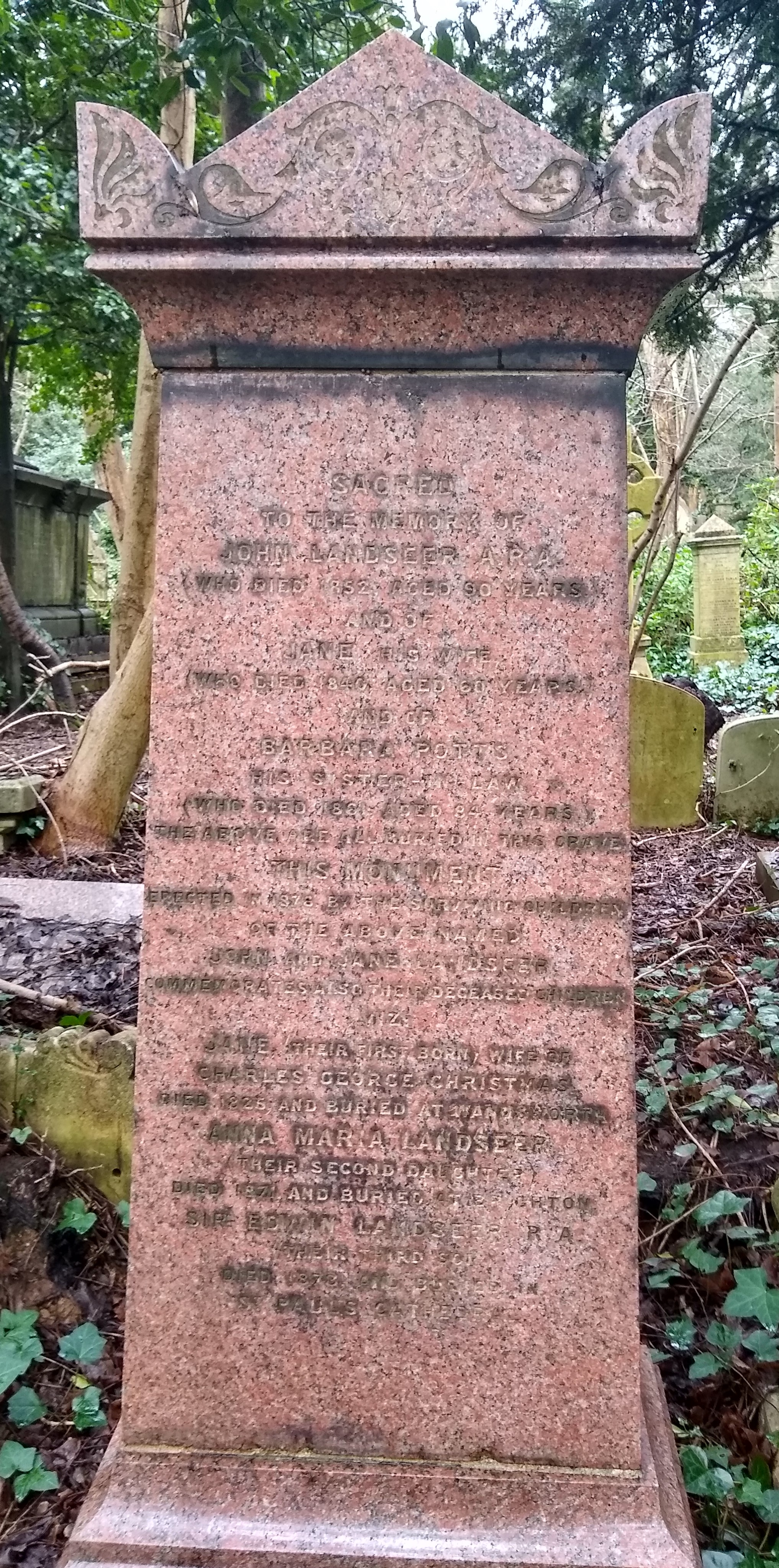
Grave of Charles Landseer in Highgate Cemetery (west)
