= John Landseer =

English landscape engraver (1762/3?–1852)

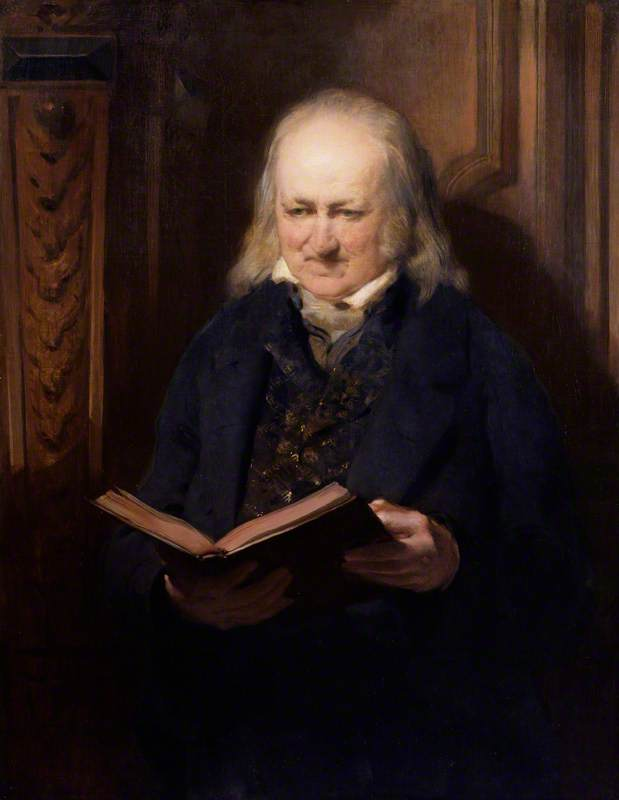

John Landseer ARA (1762/3? – 20 February 1852) was an English landscape engraver.

== Birth ==
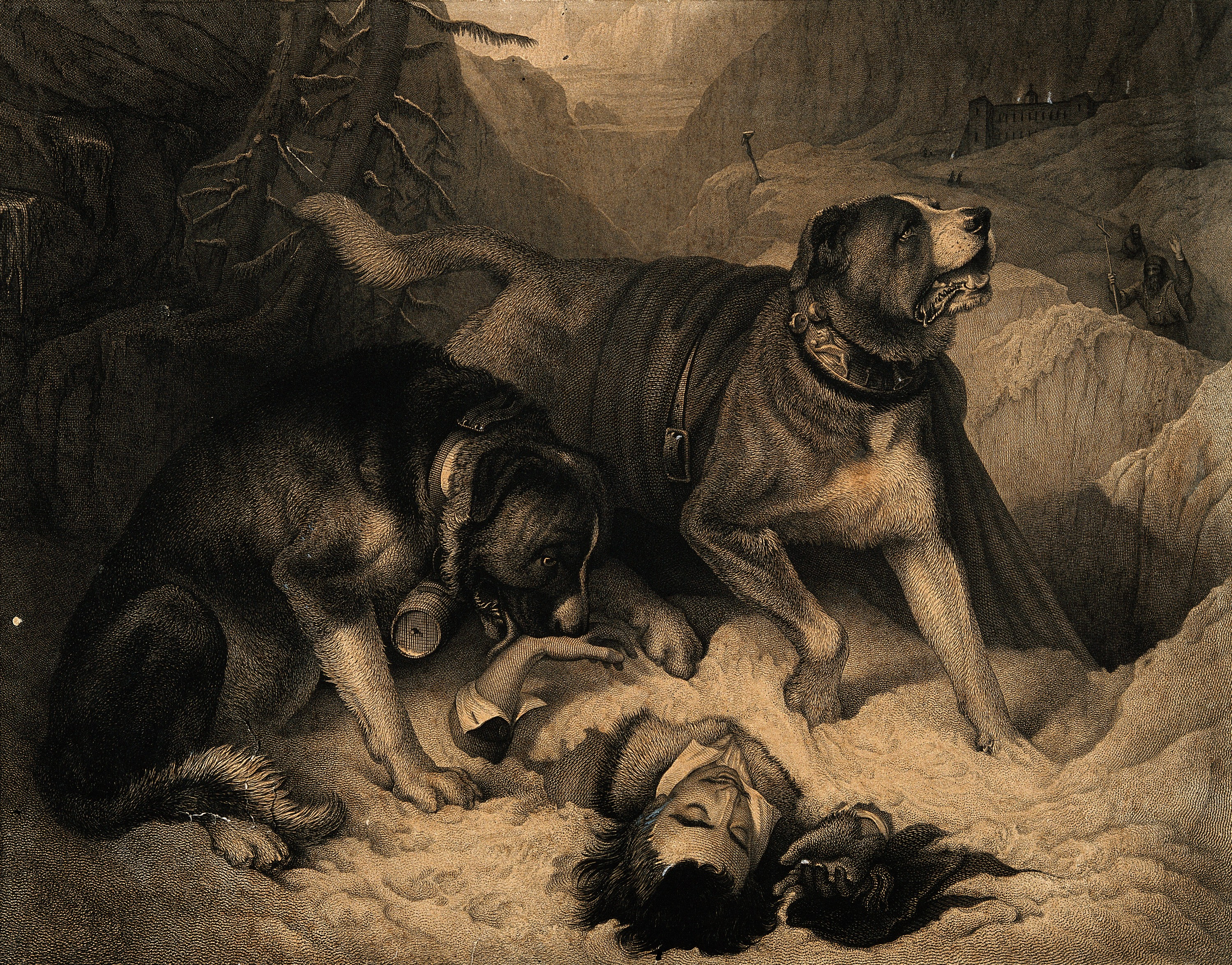
Two St. Bernard dogs with an avalanche victim, one tries to revive him while the other alerts the rescue party. Line engraving by J. Landseer, 1831, after E. Landseer.

Landseer was born in Lincoln in 1769, according to Cosmo Monkhouse, or in London in 1761, according to his son Edwin's biographer, F.G. Stephens. However, according to the England and Wales Christening Index 1530–1980, he was born on 23 January 1765 and baptised on 3 February 1765 at Westminster. The inscription on the memorial above the family grave in Highgate Cemetery, erected 24 years after his death by his surviving children, states that he died in his 90th year, which suggests that he was born in 1762 or 1763.

== Career ==
The son of a jeweller, he was apprenticed to the engraver William Byrne. As a 16-year-old apprentice, he contributed the frame surrounding a Byrne engraving for the frontispiece of Antiquities of Great Britain: Vol. I., in 1785, a work published in 1786.

He then went to work for the publisher Thomas Macklin, noted for his illustrated edition of the Bible. He started a series Views of the Isle of Wight after pictures by Ibbetson and Turner, but publication was halted when he had only executed three plates. His largest series of engravings was Twenty Views of the South of Scotland, after James Moore. Others included one after drawings of animals by Dutch artists, and another of Biblical subjects, after Raphael and others.

In 1806, he delivered a series of lectures on engraving at the Royal Institution, in which he defended engraving its status as an independent art, and criticised the issuing of inferior plates by commercially minded publishers. The series was terminated after the sixth lecture, following protests by Josiah Boydell, who claimed that Landseer had unfairly criticised his uncle John Boydell, the leading publisher of engravings, who had died in 1804. He published the lectures in 1807, with added comments reinforcing his criticism of Boydell.

Also in 1806, he was elected an Associate Engraver of the Royal Academy despite his dispute with the institution over their failure to admit engravers as full members. He had previously only exhibited there once, in 1792. Some leading engravers – including Landseer's teacher, William Byrne – chose to boycott the academy completely over the issue, but Landseer hoped to challenge its rules from within. His protests, which included petitioning the Prince Regent, proved ineffective, however and the academy's policy was not changed until after his death.

In 1813, he lectured at the Surrey Institution on The Philosophy of Art. Henry Crabb Robinson, who heard Landseer speak there, described him as "animated in style, but his animation is produced by indulgence in sarcasms, and in emphatic diction." For a while he pursued an interest in archaeology, becoming a Fellow of the Society of Antiquaries, and publishing two books on Babylonian antiquities, before returning to engraving. In 1826 he was appointed Engraver to the King, and in 1831 published a plate of Alpine Mastiffs Reanimating a Distressed Traveller after a picture painted by his son Edwin eleven years earlier, at the age of eighteen.

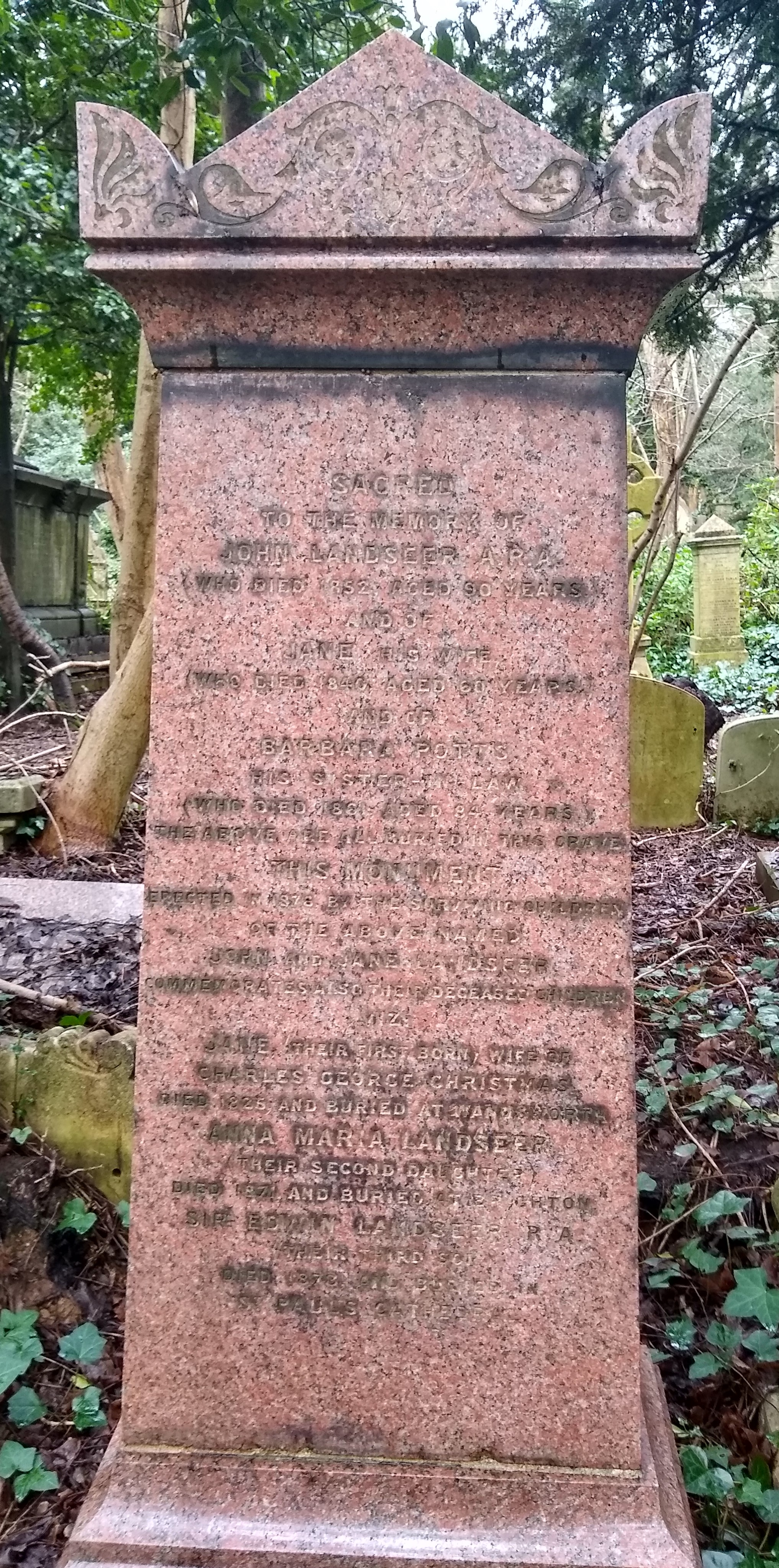
Family grave of John Landseer in Highgate Cemetery (west)

Landseer died in London on 20 February 1852 and was buried in Highgate Cemetery.

== Writings ==
- Observations on the Engraved Gems brought from Babylon to England by Abraham Lockett Esq, considered with reference to Scripture History (1817).
- Sabæan History (1823).
- Description of Fifty of the Earliest Pictures in the National Gallery (1834; only the first volume was published).

He published two short-lived periodicals: The Review of Publications in Art in 1808, and The Probe, set up in opposition to the Art-Union's journal. in 1837.

He contributed articles on schools of engraving to Rees's Cyclopædia namely the French school (Volume 15, 1810); the German (Volume 16, 1810), the Low Countries (Volume 21, 1812) and the Italian (Volume 19, 1811). He also engraved a series of plates, with monograms etc. of French, German, Low Countries and Italian engravers. All his articles are of monograph length and may have re-cycled his Royal Institution material.

== Family ==
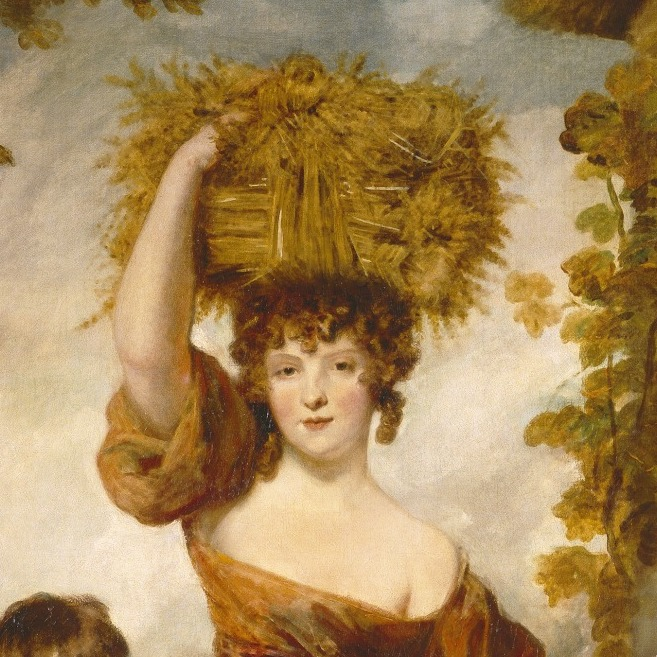
Jane Potts by Joshua Reynolds - detail from The Cottagers

On 15 December 1793, Landseer married Jane Potts, who he had met at the house of his employer, Thomas Macklin. She moved in artistic circles, and had modelled for a reaper in The Gleaners, painted for Macklin by Sir Joshua Reynolds . They had fourteen children: seven survived to reach adolescence, and four of them Thomas, Edwin, Charles and Jessica, became notable in the art world.

== Bibliography ==
- Manson, James A. (1902). Sir Edwin Landseer R.A. London: Walter Scott Publishing Co.
- This article incorporates text from a publication now in the public domain: Monkhouse, William Cosmo (1892). "Landseer, John". In Lee, Sidney (ed.). Dictionary of National Biography. Vol. 31. London: Smith, Elder & Co.
- Stephens, Frederic G. (1880). Sir Edwin Landseer. London: Sampson Low, Marston..
