= 1322 Coppernicus =

Main-belt asteroid

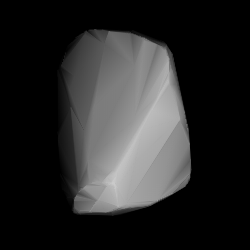
- Shape model of Coppernicus from its lightcurve

Discovery
- Discovered by: K. Reinmuth
- Discovery site: Heidelberg Obs.
- Discovery date: 15 June 1934

Designations
- Pronunciation: /kɒˈpɜːrnɪkəs/
- Named after: Nicolaus Copernicus (Polish astronomer)
- Alternative designations: 1934 LA
- Minor planet category: main-belt · (inner) background

Orbital characteristics
- Epoch 4 September 2017 (JD 2458000.5)
- Uncertainty parameter 0
- Observation arc: 83.38 yr (30,455 days)
- Aphelion: 2.9898 AU
- Perihelion: 1.8547 AU
- Semi-major axis: 2.4222 AU
- Eccentricity: 0.2343
- Orbital period (sidereal): 3.77 yr (1,377 days)
- Mean anomaly: 10.211°
- Mean motion: 0° 15^{m} 41.04^{s} / day
- Inclination: 23.359°
- Longitude of ascending node: 253.19°
- Argument of perihelion: 29.379°

Physical characteristics
- Dimensions: 9.80 km (derived); 9.996±0.203 km 10.04±0.34 km 10.192±0.029 km 10.70±0.19 km
- Synodic rotation period: 3.967 h 5.375±0.006 h
- Geometric albedo: 0.133±0.005; 0.1857±0.0429; 0.20 (assumed); 0.211±0.028
- Spectral type: S (Tholen); B–V = 0.887; U–B = 0.321
- Absolute magnitude (H): 12.30 · 12.41 · 12.70 · 12.75±0.31

1322 Coppernicus, provisional designation 1934 LA, is a stony background asteroid from the inner regions of the asteroid belt, approximately 10 kilometers in diameter. Discovered by Karl Reinmuth at Heidelberg Observatory in 1934, the asteroid was later named after Polish astronomer Nicolaus Copernicus.

== Discovery ==
Coppernicus was discovered on 15 June 1934, by German astronomer Karl Reinmuth at the Heidelberg-Königstuhl State Observatory in southwest Germany. On the same night, it was independently discovered by Belgian astronomer Eugène Delporte at Uccle Observatory. The Minor Planet Center only recognizes the first discoverer.

== Orbit and classification ==
Coppernicus is a non-family asteroid from the main belt's background population. It orbits the Sun in the inner asteroid belt at a distance of 1.9–3.0 AU once every 3 years and 9 months (1,377 days; semi-major axis of 2.42 AU). Its orbit has an eccentricity of 0.23 and an inclination of 23° with respect to the ecliptic. The body's observation arc begins at Heidelberg/Uccle in June 1934, on the night of its official discovery observation.

== Physical characteristics ==
In the Tholen classification, Coppernicus is a common, stony S-type asteroid.

=== Rotation period ===
Published in 1991, a first rotational lightcurve of Coppernicus was obtained by Polish astronomer Wiesław Wiśniewski. Lightcurve analysis gave a relatively short rotation period of 3.967 hours with a brightness variation of 0.22 magnitude (U=2). In 2006, photometric observations by Italian astronomer Federico Manzini gave a tentative period of 5.37 and 5.375 hours with an amplitude of 0.01 and 0.04, respectively (U=1/2).

=== Diameter and albedo ===
According to the surveys carried out by the Japanese Akari satellite and the NEOWISE mission of NASA's Wide-field Infrared Survey Explorer, Coppernicus measures between 9.996 and 10.70 kilometers in diameter and its surface has an albedo between 0.133 and 0.211.

The Collaborative Asteroid Lightcurve Link assumes a standard albedo for stony asteroids of 0.20 and derives a diameter of 9.80 kilometers based on an absolute magnitude of 12.41.

== Naming ==
This minor planet was named after Polish astronomer and mathematician Nicolaus Copernicus (1473–1543), the founder of modern astronomy who formulated the heliocentric model that placed the Sun rather than the Earth at the center of the Universe. The official naming citation was mentioned in The Names of the Minor Planets by Paul Herget in 1955 (H 120). The lunar crater Copernicus as well as the Martian crater Copernicus are both named in his honor. The asteroid's unusual spelling, "Coppernicus", is attributed to German biographer Leopold Prowe. (Note: The name's spelling with pp was used by Nicolaus Copernicus himself in most cases, especially in official documents. Based on over two dozen signatures of the astronomers, of which more than 74% use the spelling with two p, Prowe and Curtze came to the conclusion that the form Coppernicus is the best form to represent the chosen name of the astronomer (and the form Koppernick for his family). - Maximilian Curtze (de): Ueber die Orthographie des Namens Coppernicus., in the foreword to Nicolaus Coppernicus aus Thorn über die Kreisbewegungen der Weltkörper, 1879 (from German wikisource))
