= Jacopo Facciolati =

Italian lexicographer and philologist (1682–1769)

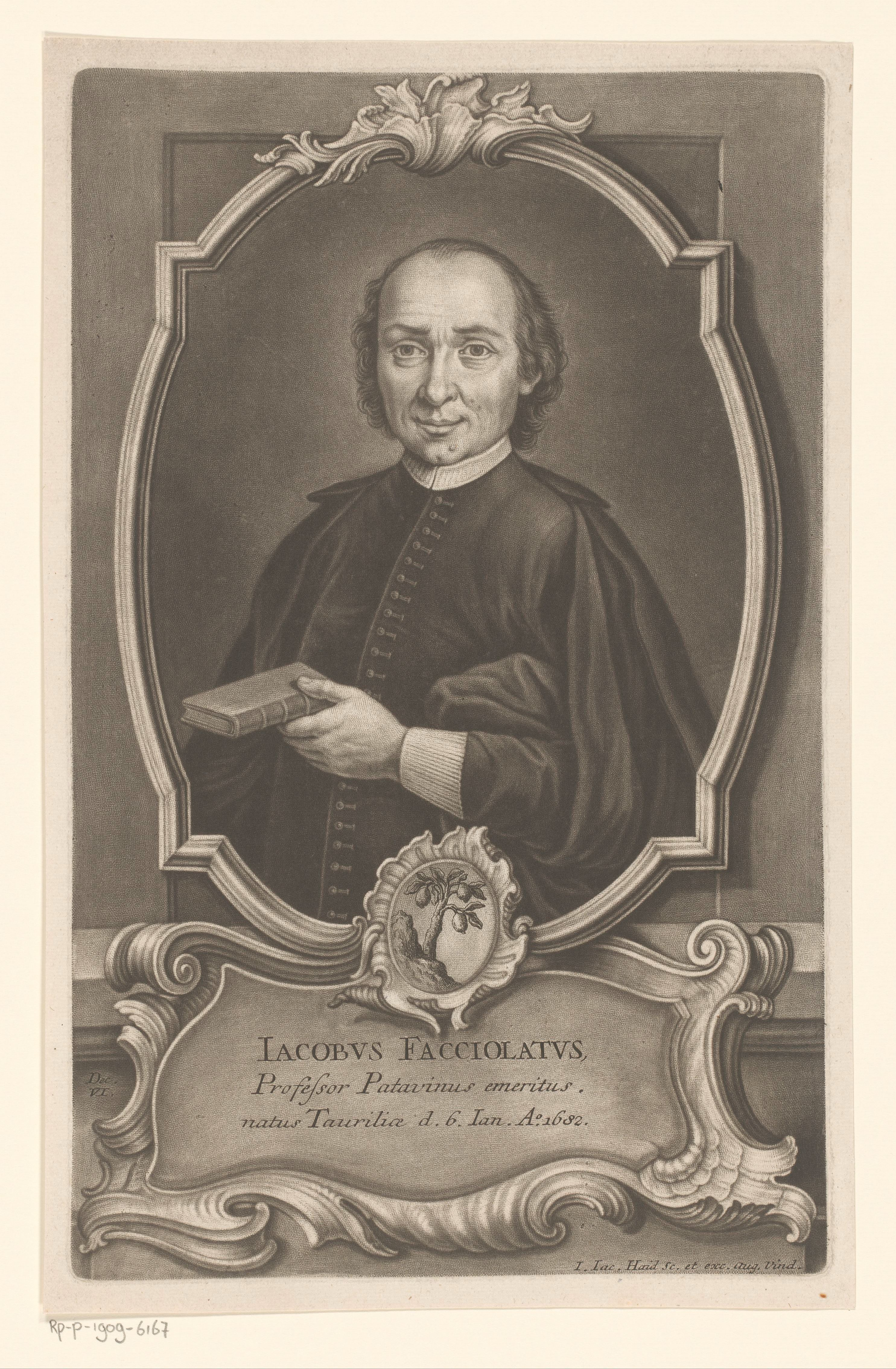
Jacopo Facciolati

Jacopo Facciolati (1682–1769) was an Italian lexicographer and philologist.

== Biography ==
He was born at Torreglia, in what is now the province of Padua (then in the Republic of Venice), in 1682. He was admitted to the seminary of Padua thanks to Cardinal Barberigo, who had formed a high opinion of the boy's talents. As a professor of logic and regent of the schools, Facciolati became the leading academic of Padua university during a period of forty-five years.

Facciolati was known overall Europe as one of the most enlightened and zealous teachers of the time; and among the many flattering invitations which he received, but always declined, was one from the king of Portugal, to accept the directorship of a college at Lisbon for the young nobility. He died in 1769.

== Works ==
He published improved editions of several philological works, such as the Thesaurus Ciceronianus of Nizolius, and in 1719 he brought out a revised edition of the Lexicon Septem Linguarum, a Latin dictionary in seven languages, called the Calepinus, from the name of its author, the monk Ambrogio Calepino. The latter work, in which he was assisted by his pupil Egidio Forcellini, he completed in four years, 1715 to 1719. It was written in seven languages, and suggested to the editor the idea of his opus magnum, the Totius Latinitatis Lexicon, which was ultimately published at Cardinal Priole's expense, 4 vols. fol., Padua, 1771 (revised ed. by de Vit, 1858-1887).

In the compilation of this work, the chief burden seems to have been borne by Facciolati's pupil Forcellini, to whom the lexicographer allows a very scanty measure of justice. The whole body of Latinity if it were to perish, might be restored from this lexicon. Facciolati's mastery of Latin style, as displayed in his epistles, has been admired for its purity and grace.

In or about 1739, Facciolati undertook the continuation of Nicolò Comneno Papadopoli, who wrote a history of the University of Padua, carrying it on to his own day. Parts claimed by Papadopoli concerning Nicolaus Copernicus were later exposed as fraudulent by Carlo Malagola and Leopold Prowe.

His history of the university was published in 1757, under the name Fasti Gymnasii Patavini.

In 1808, a volume containing nine of his Epistles never before published was issued at Padua.
