= Ambrogio Calepino =

Italian lexicographer

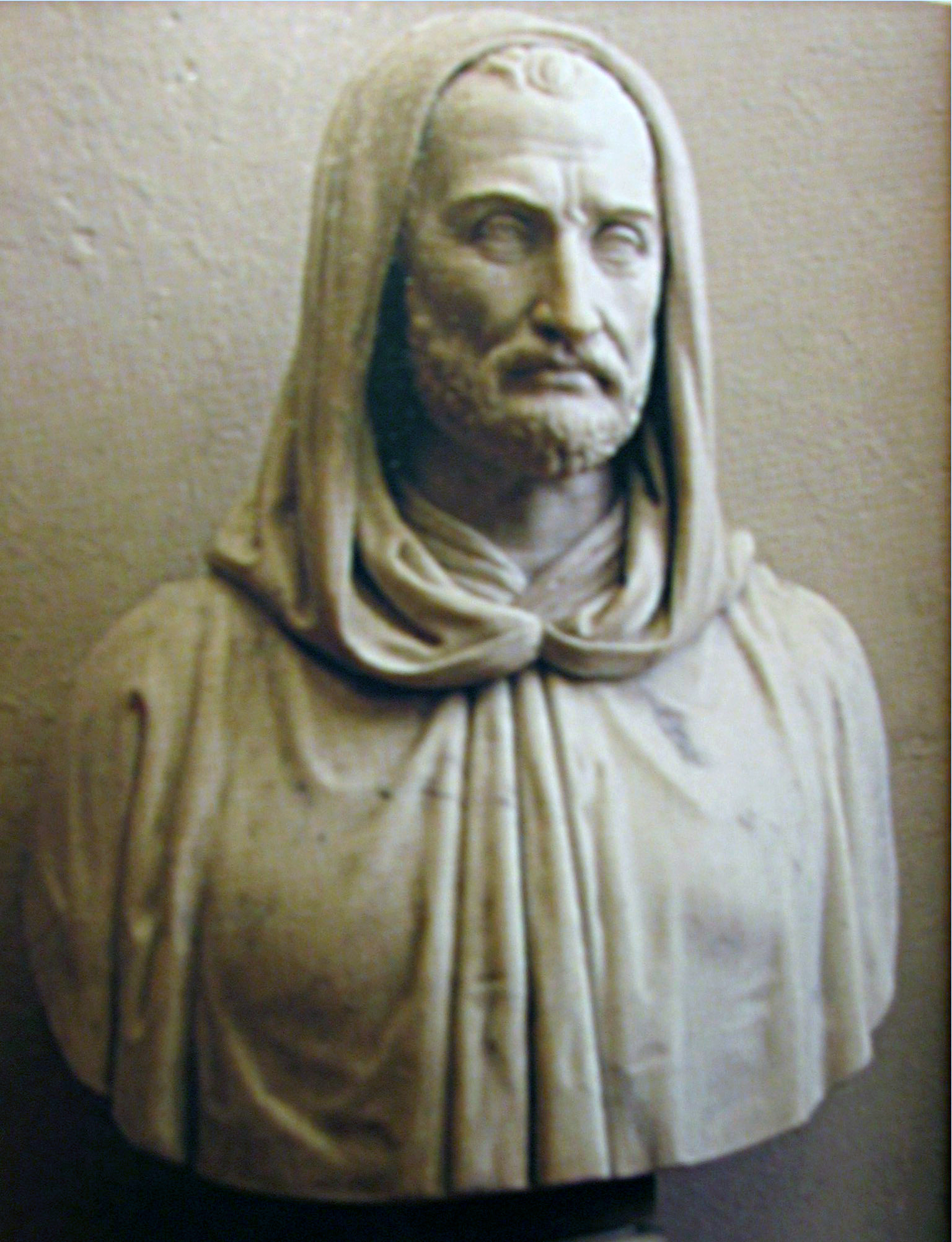
Ambrogio Calepino, Biblioteca Angelo Mai, Bergamo

Ambrogio Calepino (Latin: Ambrosius Calepinus; c. 1440–1510), commonly known by the Latin form of his name, Calepinus, was an Italian lexicographer.

Calepino was born in Castelli Calepio and died in Bergamo. He entered the Augustinian Order in 1458.

== Works ==
His Latin dictionary appeared first in 1502 at Reggio. It was reprinted many times during the 16th century, the Aldine press alone producing no fewer than 18 editions from 1542 to 1592. Later editions were considerably enlarged. To the Latin of the original were added equivalents in other languages. Thus we have the Basel edition (1590) which contains eleven languages: "Ambrosii Calepini dictionarium undecim linguarum: respondent autem Latinis vocabulis hebraica, græca, gallica, italica, germanica, belgica, hispanica, polonica, ungarica, anglica".

The edition in seven languages by Jacopo Facciolati (Pavia, 1718) with the assistance of Egidio Forcellini, was reprinted many times. Calepinus became a common name, a synonym of dictionary or lexicon, and we find titles like the following: Septem linguarum calepinus, hoc est, lexicon latinum. Calepino also wrote the life of John Bonus of Mantua which is found in the Acta Sanctorum for 22 October (Oct. IX, 748–767).

== Biography ==
Ambrogio Calepio (known as Calepino), whose given name was Giacomo (but universally known as Ambrogio), was the natural son of Count Trussardo da Calepio and Caterina de Bucellenis of a wealthy and noble family of Bergamo at a date that, in the absence of certain documents, is placed between 1435 and 1440, in the vicinity of San Michele al Pozzo Bianco. Giacomo had two brothers: Marco, also a natural son, and Nicolino to whom the family property passed by inheritance.

Count Trussardo ensured a good education for his son by leaving him a fortune of two thousand liras tied to his attainment of his twenty-fifth birthday, such as the one hundred and fifty gold scudi left on deposit with the congregation of the Misericordia Maggiore left to him by Giovanni di Marco da Rudiano, always upon reaching his twenty-fifth birthday, who, following the tradition for cadets of noble families, or perhaps it was the obligatory tradition for those who were born out of wedlock, in 1458 entered the convent of the Order of Saint Augustine, where, in 1459 he took the name Ambrose. He lived through the period of the Catholic Reformation with the reforms of the orders by inserting himself in the promotion of the reform. On 26 July 1458, having attained the age of eighteen and emancipation, he renounced his father's rich inheritance in favor of the observant congregation. Part of this was used for the creation of the gilded polyptych by Maestro of 1458 preserved in the Carrara Academy. Part of the inheritance was not given to the convent, but his brother Micolino, who managed it and was the young man's guardian, divided it into several parts later disbursed. Thereafter a diatribe arose between Nicolino and the convent over the payment of the inheritance, Ambrogio, in a 1460 document stated that he was twenty years old, this would bring his date of birth to 1440.

After serving his novitiate in several monasteries in Lombard cities (Milan, Cremona, Brescia, and Mantua), he returned to his hometown where he was able to refine his knowledge, so much so that he began to devote himself to the preparation of a vocabulary, devoting himself to humanistic studies to delve into classical Latin texts believing that ancient cultures were fundamental to grasping the meaning of scripture. He also studied texts by secular authors, and did so for personal preparation. Despite being convinced that the classical works were perfect, he soon realized that their translation had some deficiencies and needed additions so he worked for the creation of a text that would help the reading of these texts.

The first edition of the Dictionarium latinum was published in 1502 by the Emilian printer Dionigi Bertocchi,after a good two decades of study by Calepio, but was considered incomplete due to omissions and inappropriate additions made by the printer himself. Calepio immediately set to work to improve and complete his work, quickly producing a second edition.

In the first edition, the dictionary was monolingual in Latin and contained many quotations. In contrast, the second edition, published in 1509, was in four languages: Hebrew language, Ancient Greek, Latin and Italian language. Calepius continued his lexicographical work but, partly due to the onset of Visual impairment, was unable to see the final result of his labors.

He died in his convent in 1511, and his work was completed by his brethren. The results were seen in 1520, when Bernardino Benaglio of Bergamo printed the 24th edition of the vocabulary, considered the definitive one. The work became famous throughout Europe as "Calepino," in honor of its author, and its wide notoriety was also due to the fact that it later took on a polyglot character, with versions in numerous modern languages. As many as two hundred and eleven reissues were printed from 1502 to 1779, printings that led the work to undergo numerous changes.

In the Italian language, the word "calepino" has become Antonomasia term for "vocabulary," also used in joking contexts.
