= Niccolò Comneno Papadopoli =

Italian-Greek lawyer and historian (1655-1740)

Niccolò Comneno Papadopoli (Greek: Νικόλαος Κομνηνός Παπαδόπουλος, Nikólaos Komninós Papadópoulos; 6 January 1655 on Crete – 20 January 1740 in Padua) was an Italian lawyer and historian of Greek origin. He lived in the Republic of Venice.

== Life ==
He was born to Zuanne (Giovanni) Papadopoli, a Greco-Venetian administrator at Candia, present day Heraklion. He claimed descent from the Komnenian dynasty, but this claim is considered fictional by modern historians

Papadopoli studied Canon Law and became a librarian at the University of Padua. In 1726 he published on the history of the university.

That work contains gross inaccuracies (if not lies), for example regarding the life of Oliver Cromwell and Nicolaus Copernicus. Papadopoli had falsely claimed in 1726 that he had seen an entry of Copernicus in records of a "Polish nation" at the university. In the century that had passed since, this claim had been widely published and "found a place in all subsequent biographies of Copernicus, but the decorative particulars added by the historian of the Pavian university have been shown to be wholly incorrect" and utterly baseless as shown over 150 years by Carlo Malagola and Leopold Prowe.

Papadopoli's work was continued since 1739 by Jacopo Facciolati.

== Literature ==
- Von Moy de Sons, K. E., Vehring, Fr. H. : Archiv für Katholisches Kirchenrecht, Verlag Franz Kirchheim, Mainz1863 (Google Buchsuche)
- Christian Pletzing:„Deutsche Kultur" und „polnische Zivilisation" Geschichtsbilder in West- und Ostpreußen zwischen Vormärz und Kulturkampf, S. 189-204, in: Matthias Weber: Preussen in Ostmitteleuropa: Geschehensgeschichte und Verstehensgeschichte, Oldenbourg Wissenschaftsverlag, 2003, ISBN 3-486-56718-7, ISBN 978-3-486-56718-2
- Stefan Kirschner, Andreas Kühne: "Die Rezeption von Copernicus im Spiegel seiner Biographien"; in: Form, Zahl, Ordnung. Studien zur Wissenschaftsgeschichte. Festschrift für Ivo Schneider zum 65. Geburtstag; hrsg. v. Rudolf Seising, Menso Folkerts, Ulf Hashagen; Stuttgart (Steiner) 2004 (Boethius, Bd. 48), S. 467-479 (Google Buchsuche)
