= Malagola =

Malagola is an Italian surname. Notable people with the surname include:

- Amilcare Malagola (1840–1895), Italian Roman Catholic cardinal
- Carlo Malagola (1855–1910), Italian historian
- Gedeone Malagola (1924–2008), Brazilian comics artist and editor
