= Gaspare Trimbocchi =

Italian Renaissance humanist (1439–1492)

Gaspare Trimbocchi, called il Tribacco (c. 23 February 1439 – c. 1492) was an Italian Renaissance humanist.

== Biography ==
He was born in Reggio Emilia, the illegitimate child of Jacopo Trimbocchi, although by 1456 he was recognized as offspring by his father and moved into the paternal home in Modena. There he studied under Guarino da Verona until about 1459. By 1461 he had moved to Ferrara, and obtained by October a stipend from Borso d’Este, to travel to travel to Greece. It is unclear if he ever went. Borso added stipends to employ him as a teacher of Latin grammar in Modena, where among his pupils was Antonio Urceo (il Codro da Rubiera). By 1466, he was a teacher in Ferrara.

After the death of Borso in 1471, he moved to Venice, where he received a commission to teach in Ragusa. However, he was imprisoned for some debts or obligations. Freed, he fled to Mantua, where he became a tutor to the children of Federico Gonzaga. He was known as a scholar of Classic Latin texts, and praises from contemporaries such as Tito Vespasiano Strozzi, Matteo Maria Boiardo, Marcantonio Aldegati, Raffaele Zovenzoni, and Bartolomeo Paganelli, recall a dense output of Latin poetic forms, including hymns (Horatian carmen); satyrical poems; eclogues; epigrams; and occasional poems. He dedicated in 1463 an encomium describing the Triumph of Borso d'Este (Trimphus). Other poems include:

- De apparatu divi Borsii Estensis contra Turcum Christi persecutorem
- De velocitate temporis
- De casibus Herculis in insania

He died in poverty. Dionigi Trimbocco (died 1526) was putatively a grandson of Gaspare, and taught literature and classic languages for decades in Modena.
