= Christian Friedrich Tieck =

German sculptor (1776–1851)

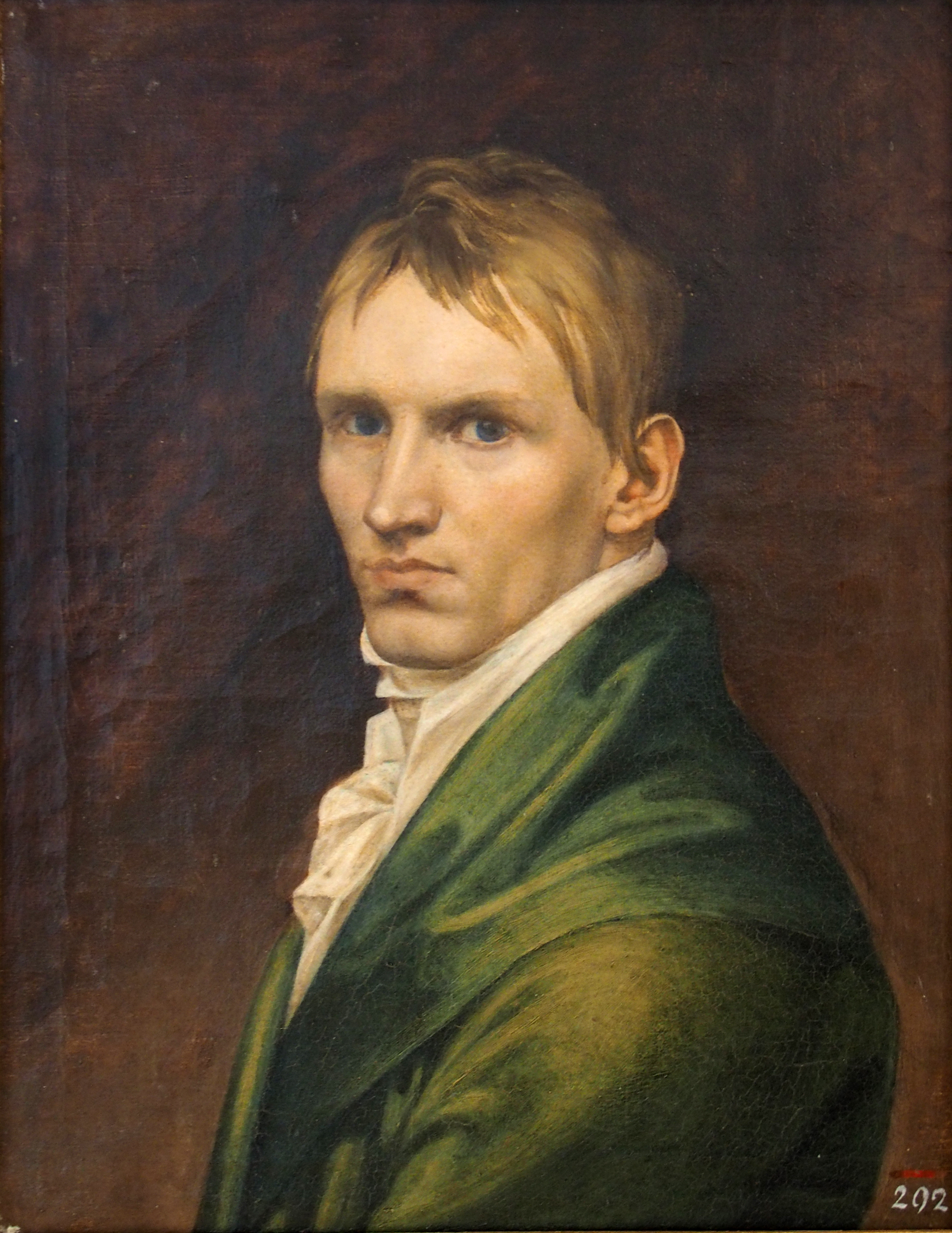
Self portrait 1805/1806

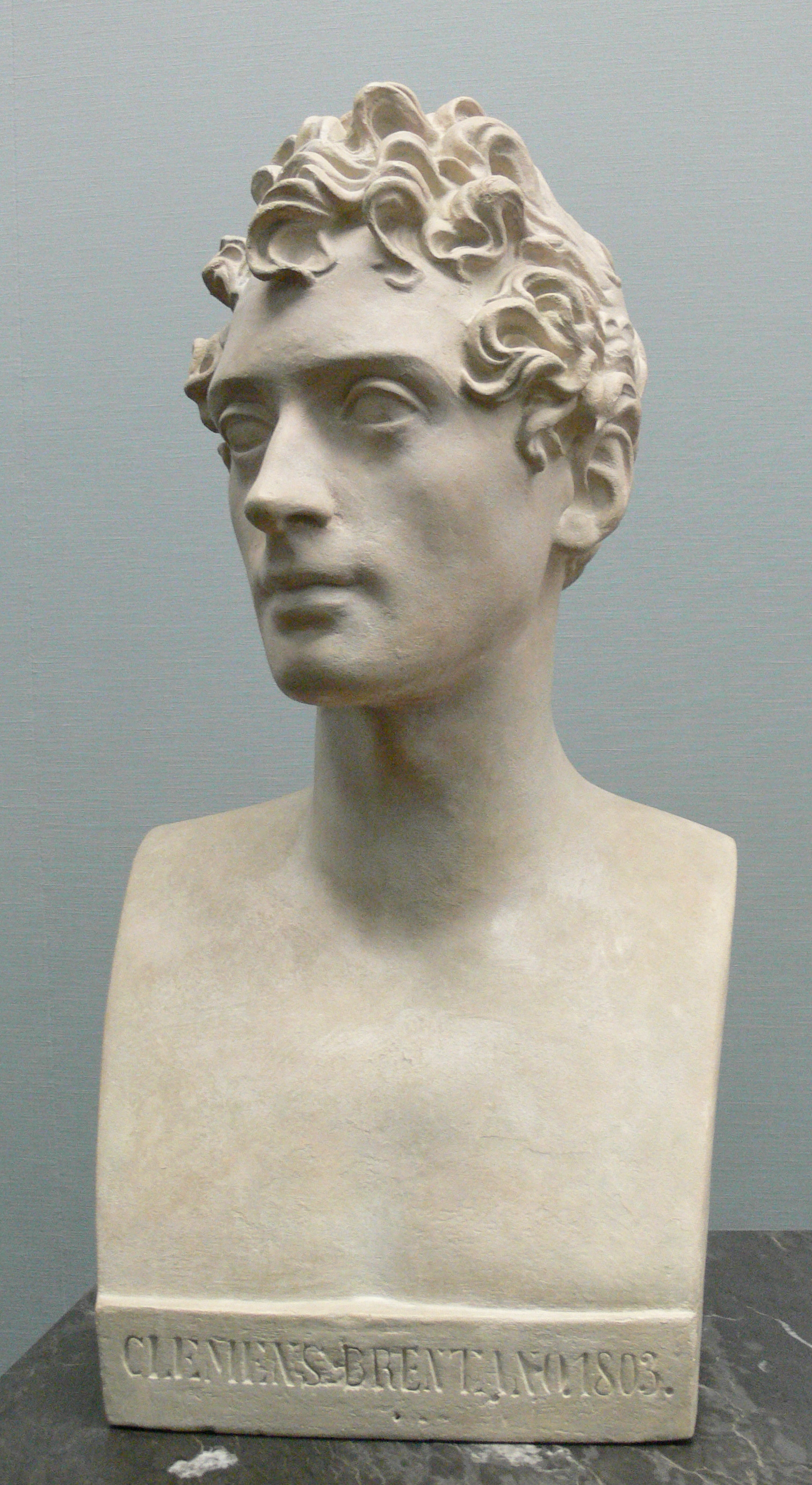
C. F. Tieck: Clemens Brentano, 1803

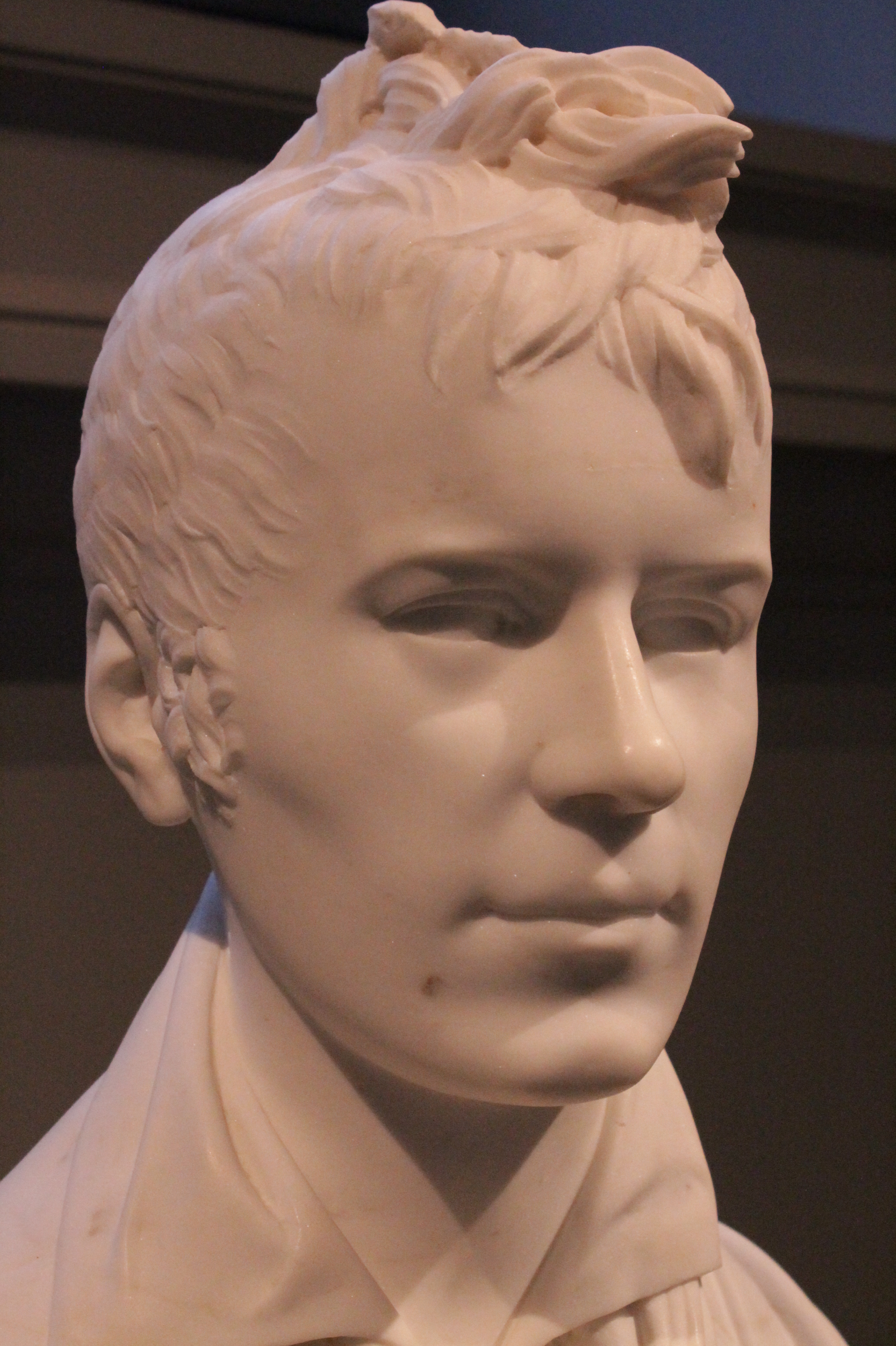
Alexander von Humboldt by Christian Friedrich Tieck 1805, Albertinum, Dresden

Christian Friedrich Tieck (14 August 1776 – 24 May 1851), often known only as Friedrich Tieck, was a German sculptor and a occasional artist in oils. His work was primarily figurative and includes both public statuary and private commissions for portrait busts.

== Biography ==
Tieck was born in Berlin, the third child of a rope-maker living on Rossstrasse (now called Fischerinsel). He was educated at the Friedrichswerder High School in Berlin. In 1789 he began an apprenticeship as a sculptor under Heinrich Bettkober.

From 1795 he was then further trained in sculpture at the Prussian Academy of Art in Berlin under the highly eminent sculptor, Johann Gottfried Schadow, and then trained further with David d'Angers in Paris. In 1801-05 he was employed at Weimar, where he associated with Goethe, and designed his bust, which he afterwards also executed in marble for the Walhalla temple. In 1805 he went to Italy, returning to Germany in 1809, at the invitation of Crown Prince Ludwig of Bavaria. For this patron he executed at Munich and Carrara a large number of busts, including those of the Prince himself, of Schelling, of Alexander von Humboldt, and of his brother Ludwig. In 1819 he began his celebrated series of mythological sculptures for the Royal Theatre at Berlin, and in 1820 he was made professor at the Berlin Academy, designing statues of genii for the National Monument for the Liberation Wars. This work occupied him until 1829, when he began the series for the Berlin Museum, which include the bronze group of “Horse Tamers” upon the roof, and a statue of Karl Friedrich Schinkel in the corridor.

Based on a concept by Schinkel, Tieck created the tomb of General Gerhard von Scharnhorst at Berlin's Invalidenfriedhof in 1822. He also created a bust of Wilhelm Heinrich Wackenroder and a lion made of bronze after a model by Christian Daniel Rauch. Tieck's monument to Nicolaus Copernicus was erected posthumously in Thorn.

Tieck was one of the principal representatives of the school founded by Rauch. His technique, however, was less naturalistic than that of Rauch, and smoother and more detailed in execution.

He died in Berlin in 1851.

== Family ==
He was brother of Ludwig Tieck and Sophie Tieck.

He married only briefly in 1846 to Marie Caroline Louise Paetsch. The marriage was seen as scandalous as he was 70 and his bride was only 20. However, the marriage seems to have been largely a "marriage of convenience" on his part, as he sought a large dowry and further aid to pay his growing debts. Her parents got the marriage annulled after a few months.

== Gallery ==
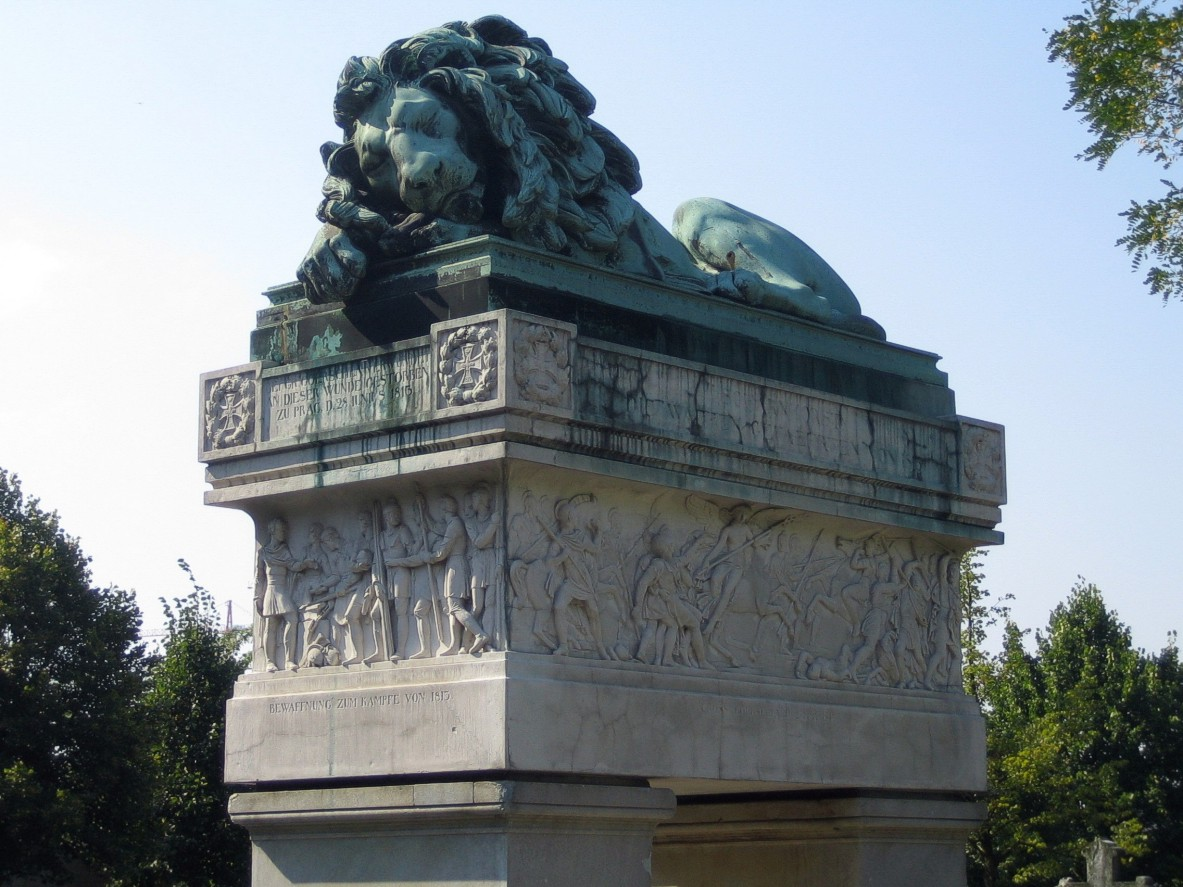
Tomb of General Gerhard von Scharnhorst

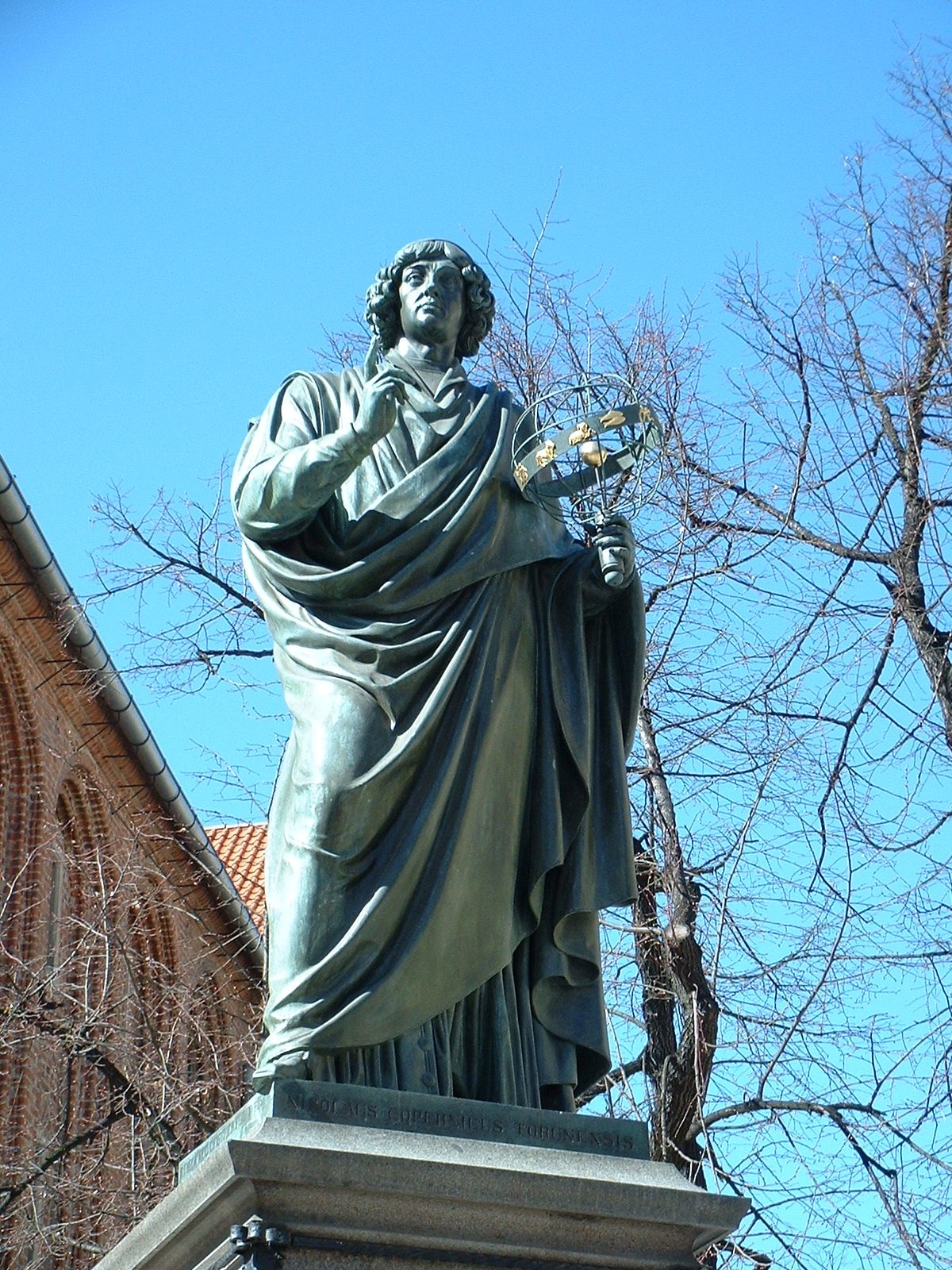
Monument to Nicolaus Copernicus, sponsored by Leopold Prowe, erected in Thorn (now Toruń) in 1853

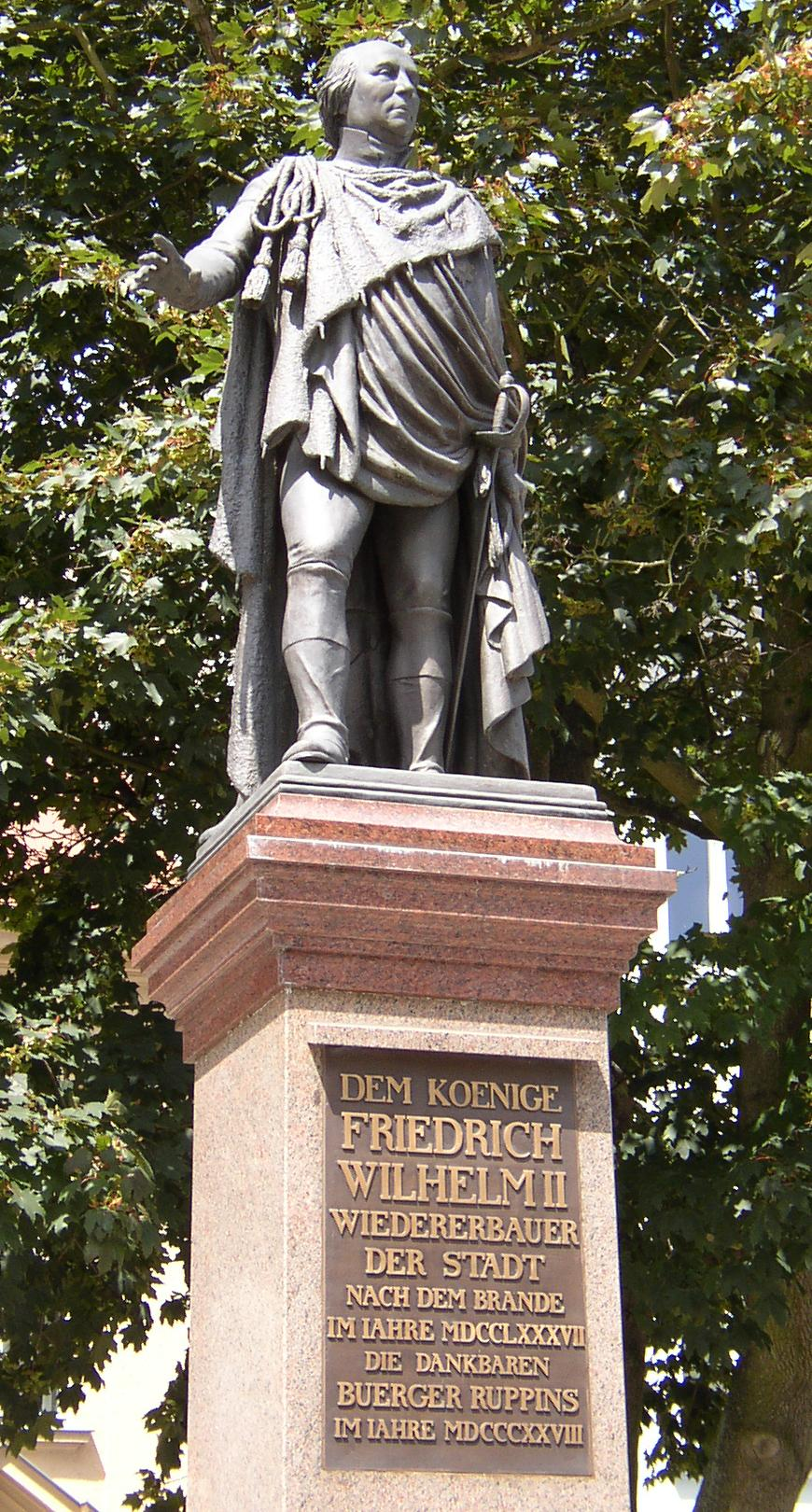
Statue of King Frederick William II of Prussia in Neuruppin

== Sources ==
- Wilhelm Bernhardi (1894). "Tieck, Christian Friedrich" . Allgemeine Deutsche Biographie (in German). Vol. 38. Leipzig: Duncker & Humblot. pp. 247–251.
- Gilman, D. C.; Peck, H. T.; Colby, F. M., eds. (1905). "Tieck, Christian Friedrich" . New International Encyclopedia (1st ed.). New York: Dodd, Mead.
