= Antonio Urceo =

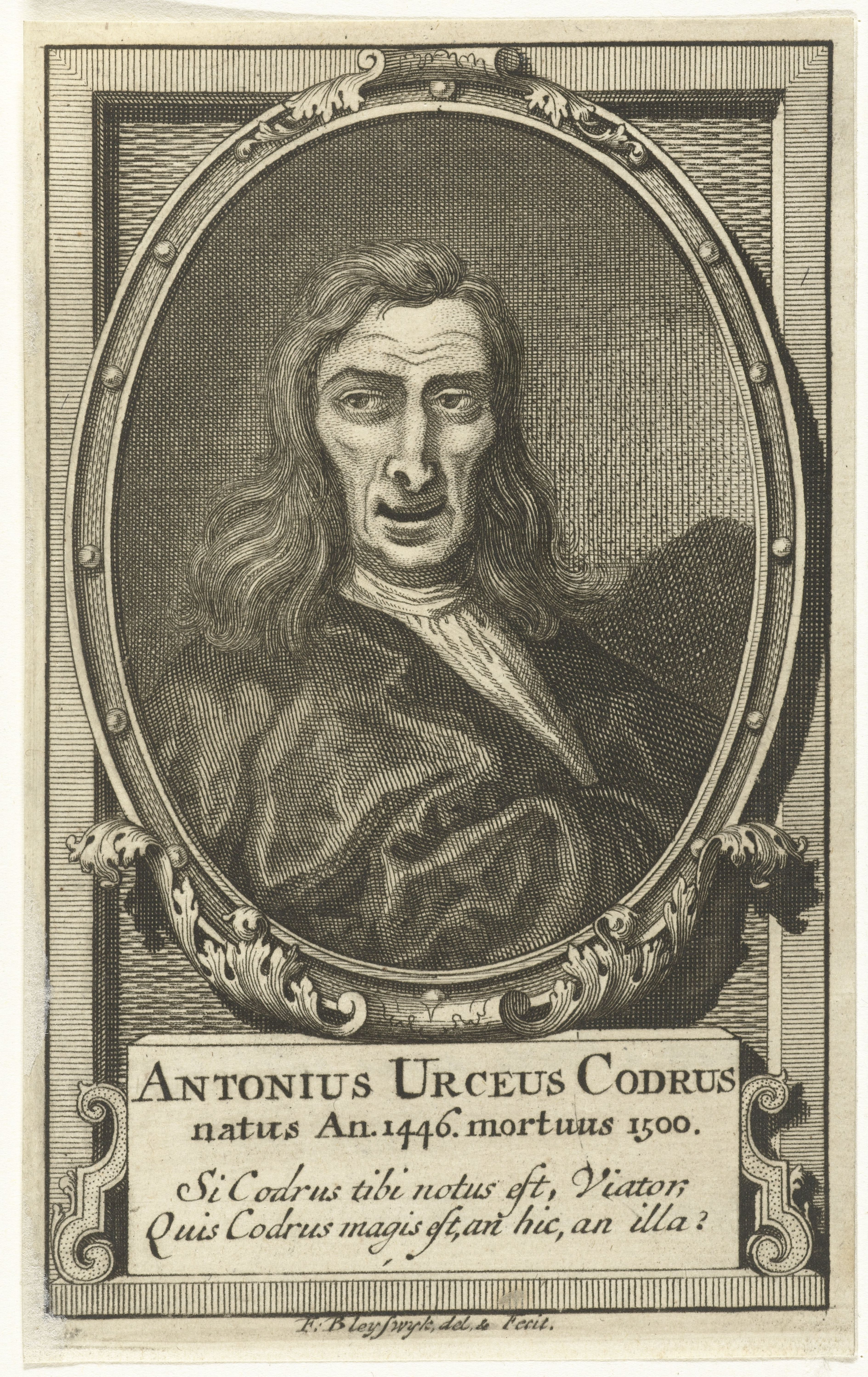
- Engraved portrait of Antonio Urceo by Frans van Bleyswyck
- Born: 1446; Rubiera
- Died: 1500 (aged 53–54); Bologna
- Occupations: Humanist, teacher

Antonio Urceo, called Codro (Antonius Urceus Codrus, 1446, Rubiera–1500, Bologna) was an Italian humanist who taught grammar and eloquence in Bologna (where Nicolaus Copernicus was among his students).

== Biography ==
Antonio Urceo was born in Rubiera, Reggio Emilia, in 1446. He studied in Modena under the poet and humanist Gaspare Trimbocchi (il Tribraco). In Forlì he was the teacher of Sinibaldo Ordelaffi, son of the Lord of the city, Pino III Ordelaffi.

Urceo Codro is remembered, among other things, for writing a new fifth act for the Aulularia of Plautus (of the original fifth act of the play only fragments survive). Later other authors, e.g. Martin Dorp, provided their own versions of the missing scenes.

Urceo was esteemed in his time as a Greek scholar; Angelo Poliziano wrote to ask his opinion on some Greek poems, and the second volume of Greek epistolographers printed by Aldus Manutius was dedicated to Urceo.

Urceo's biography was written by Carlo Malagola.

== Bibliography ==
- Malagola, Carlo (1878). Della vita e delle opere di Antonio Urceo detto Codro: studi e ricerche. Fava e Garagnani: Bologna.
- Gualdo Rosa, Lucia (1983). "CORTESI URCEO, Antonio, detto Codro". Dizionario Biografico degli Italiani (in Italian). Vol. 29: Cordier–Corvo. Rome: Istituto dell'Enciclopedia Italiana. ISBN 978-88-12-00032-6.
