= Copernicus (Martian crater) =

Crater on Mars

Copernicus Crater
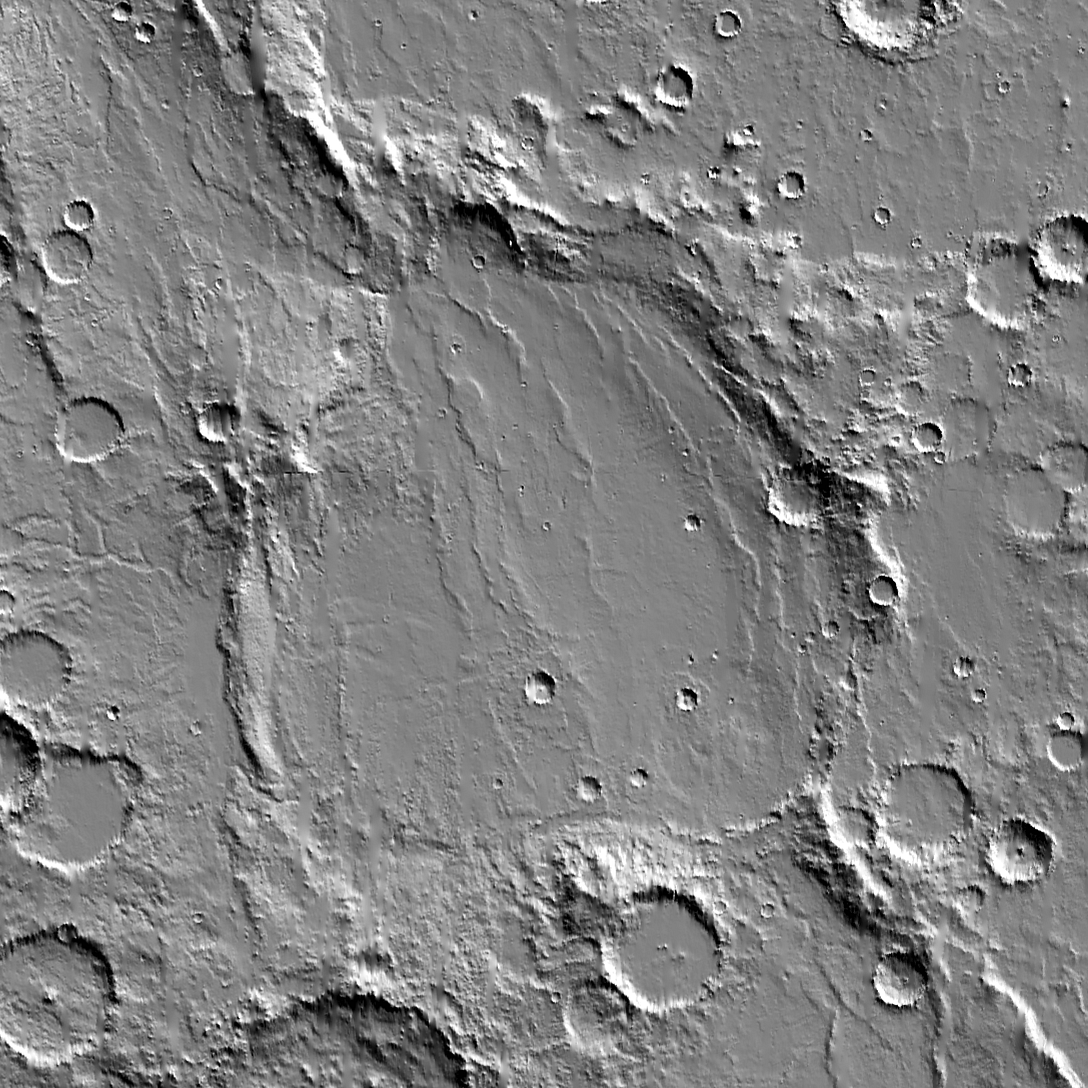
- A daytime infrared image mosaic from the Thermal Emission Imaging System (THEMIS) instrument of the 2001 Mars Odyssey spacecraft
- Planet: Mars
- Coordinates: 48.8°S 168.8°W
- Quadrangle: Phaethontis
- Diameter: c. 300 km
- Eponym: Nicolaus Copernicus

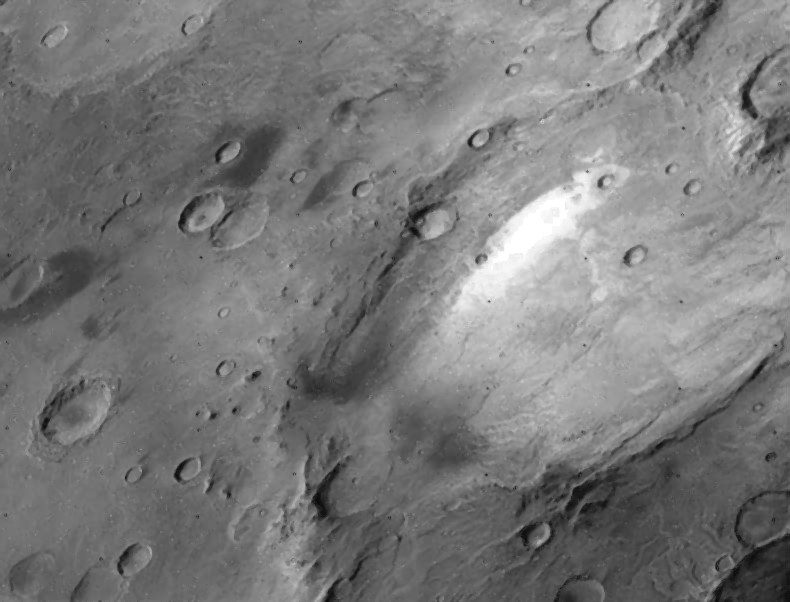
Viking 1 image of Copernicus (right)

Copernicus is a large crater on Mars, with a diameter close to 300 km. It is located south of the planet's equator in the heavily cratered highlands of Terra Sirenum in the Phaethontis quadrangle at 48.8°S and 191.2°E. Its name was approved in 1973, and it was named after Nicolaus Copernicus.

== Description ==
The impact that formed Copernicus likely occurred more than 3 billion years ago. The crater contains smaller craters within its basin and is particularly notable for gully formations that are presumed to be indicative of past liquid water flows. Many small channels exist in this area; they are further evidence of liquid water. On the basis of their form, aspects, positions, and location amongst and apparent interaction with features thought to be rich in water ice, many researchers believed that the processes carving the gullies involve liquid water. However, this remains a topic of active research. As soon as gullies were discovered, researchers began to image many gullies over and over, looking for possible changes. By 2006, some changes were found. Later, with further analysis it was determined that the changes could have occurred by dry granular flows rather than being driven by flowing water. With continued observations many more changes were found in Gasa Crater and others. With more repeated observations, more and more changes have been found; since the changes occur in the winter and spring, experts are tending to believe that gullies were formed from dry ice. Before-and-after images demonstrated the timing of this activity coincided with seasonal carbon-dioxide frost and temperatures that would not have allowed for liquid water. When dry ice frost changes to a gas, it may lubricate dry material to flow especially on steep slopes. In some years frost, perhaps as thick as 1 meter.

== Dust devil tracks ==
Many areas on Mars experience the passage of giant dust devils. A thin coating of fine bright dust covers most of the Martian surface. When a dust devil goes by it blows away the coating and exposes the underlying dark surface. Dust devils have been seen from the ground and high overhead from orbit. They have even blown the dust off of the solar panels of the two Rovers on Mars, thereby greatly extending their lives. The twin Rovers were designed to last for 3 months, instead they have lasted for years and are still going. Opportunity Rover has lasted over 10 years and is still sending back data as of August 2017. The pattern of the tracks have been shown to change every few months.

== Gallery ==
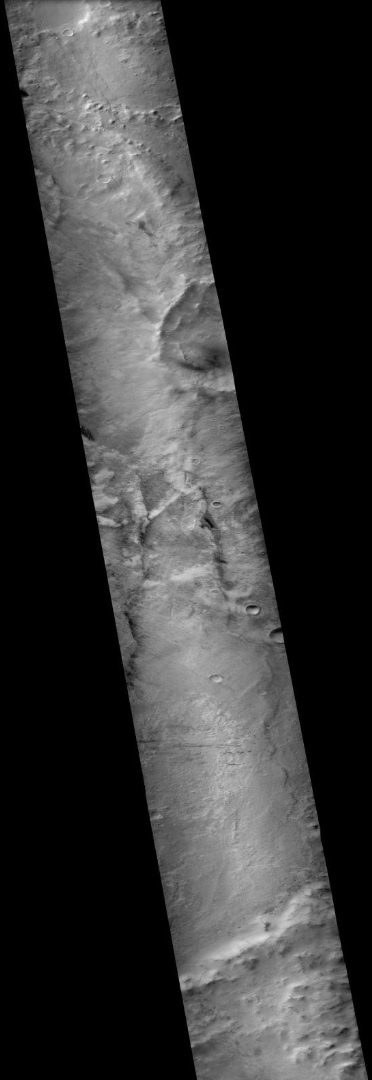
Eastern edge of Copernicus Crater (Martian Crater), as seen by CTX camera (on Mars Reconnaissance Orbiter).

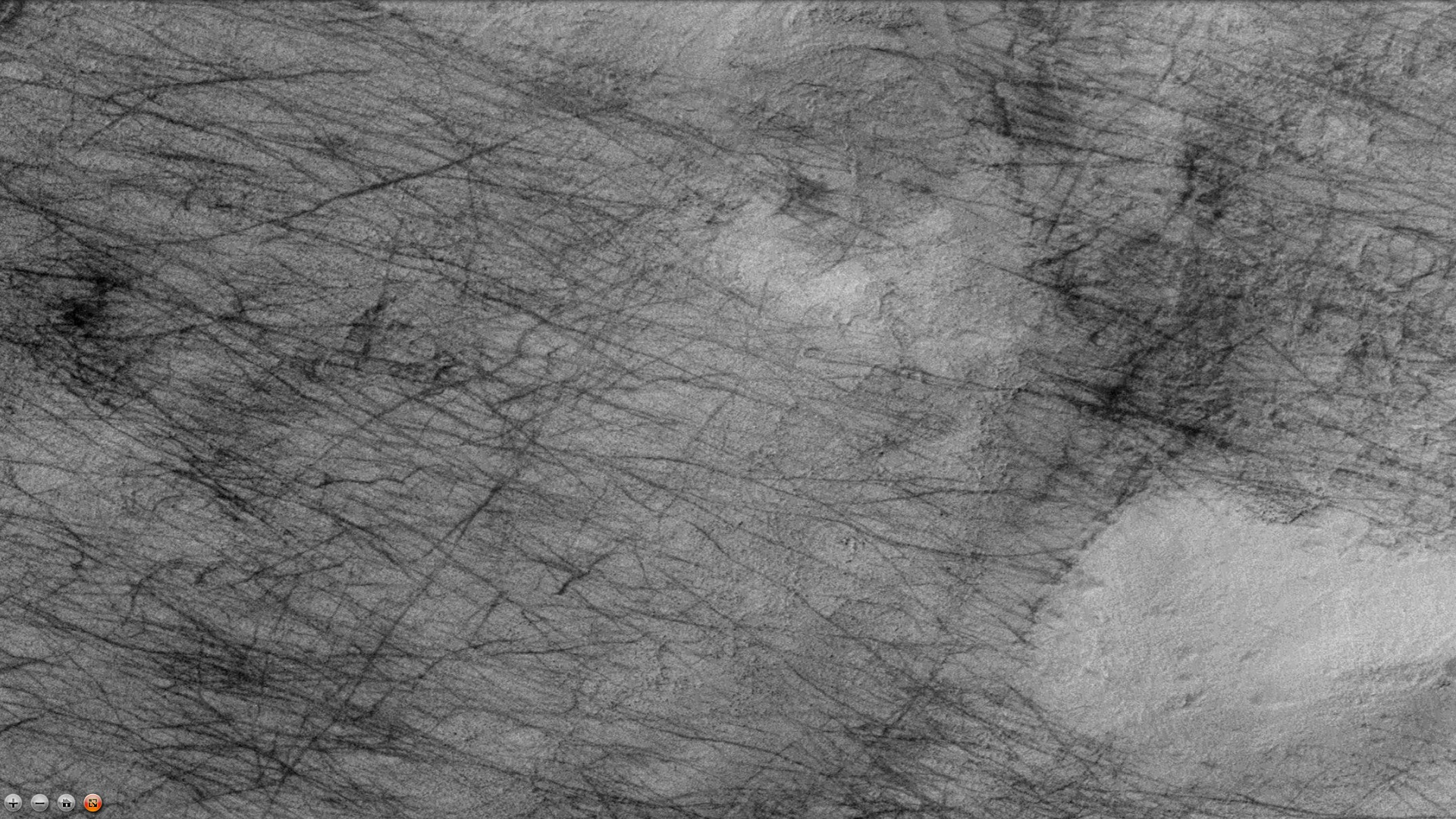
Dust devil tracks on floor of Copernicus Crater, as seen by CTX camera (on Mars Reconnaissance Orbiter). Note: this is an enlargement of the previous image of the eastern edge of Copernicus.

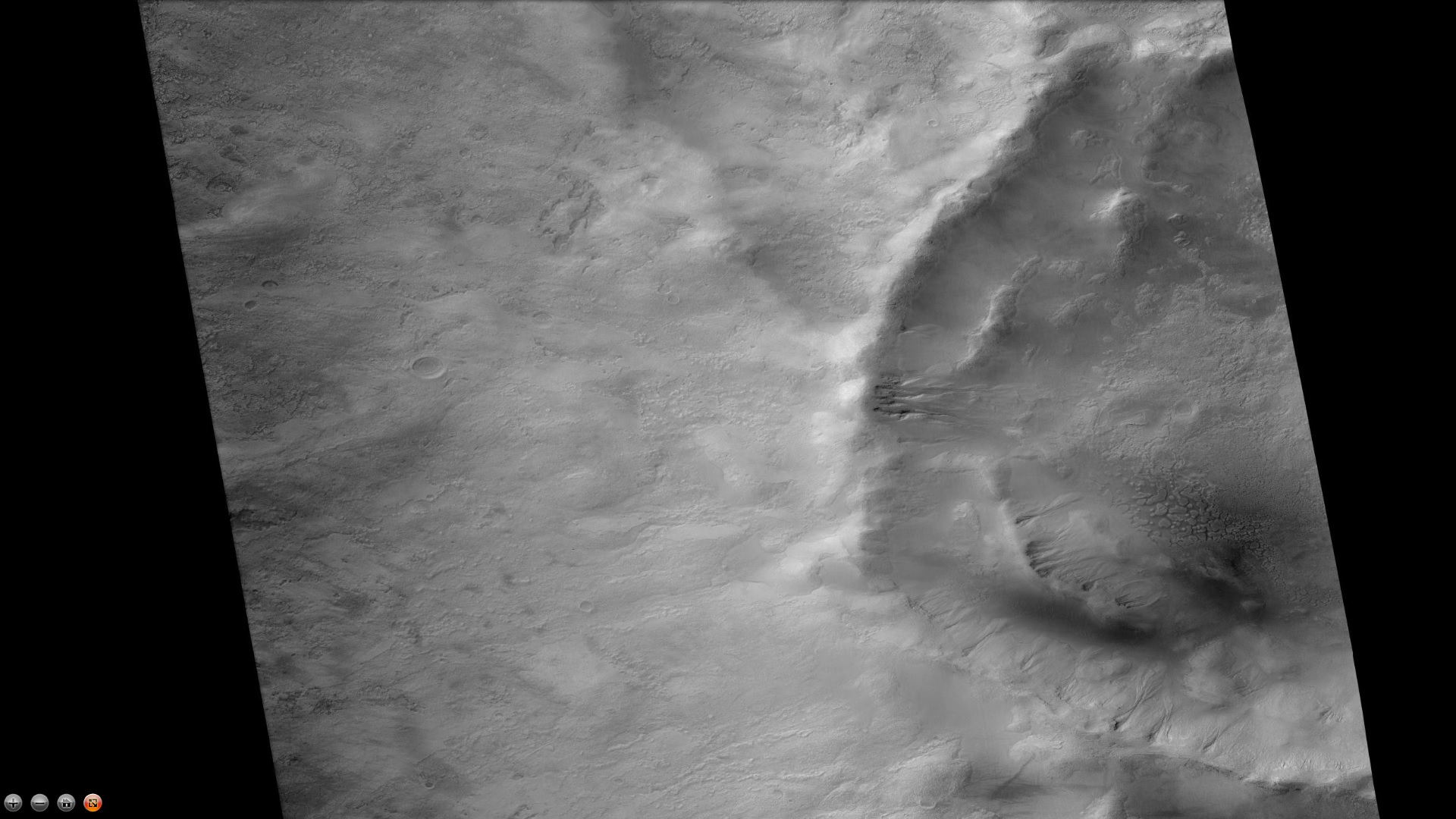
Gullies in small crater on rim of Copernicus Crater, as seen by CTX camera (on Mars Reconnaissance Orbiter). Note: this is an enlargement of a previous image of the eastern edge of Copernicus.

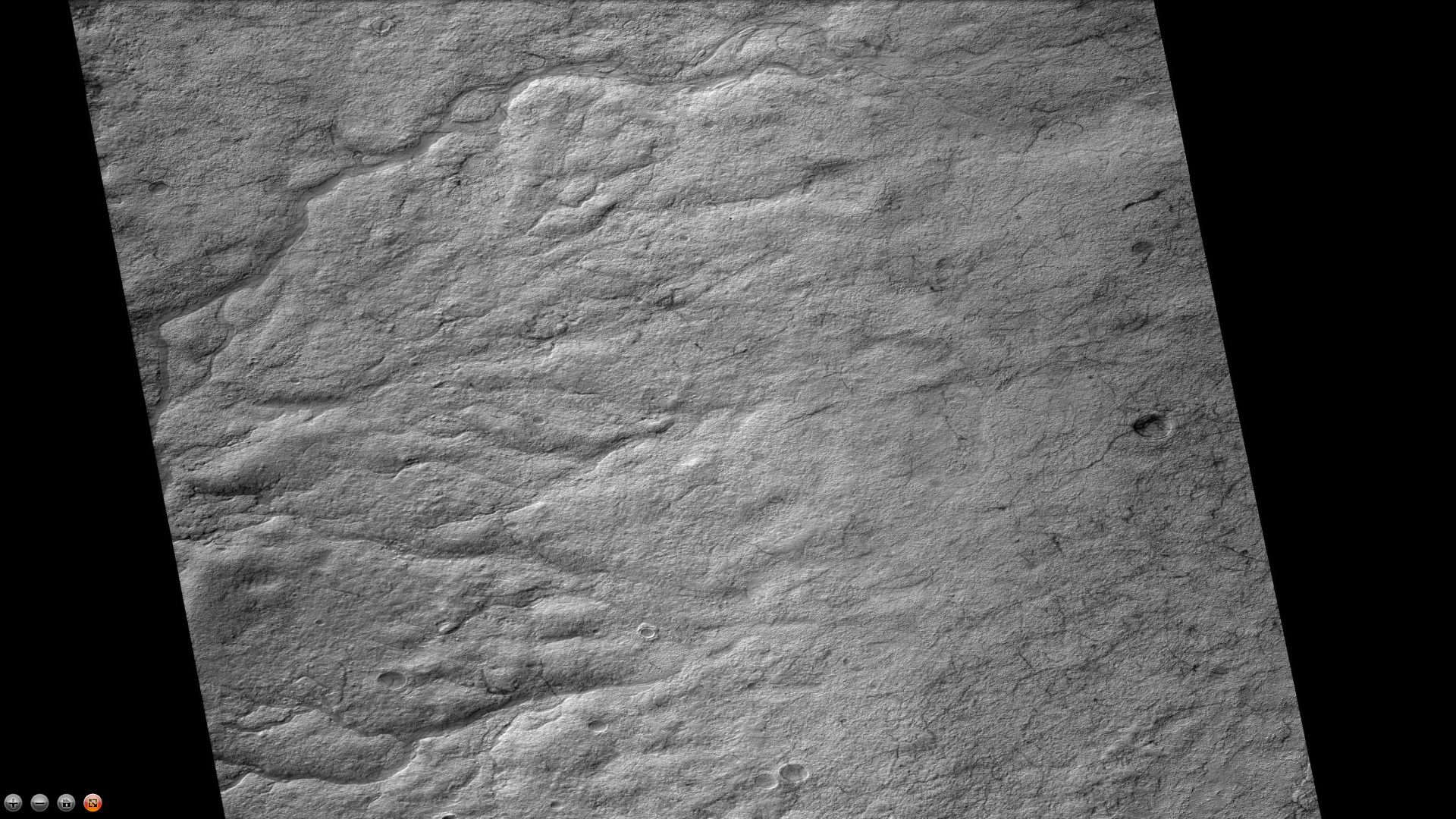
Channels on the floor of Copernicus Crater, as seen by CTX

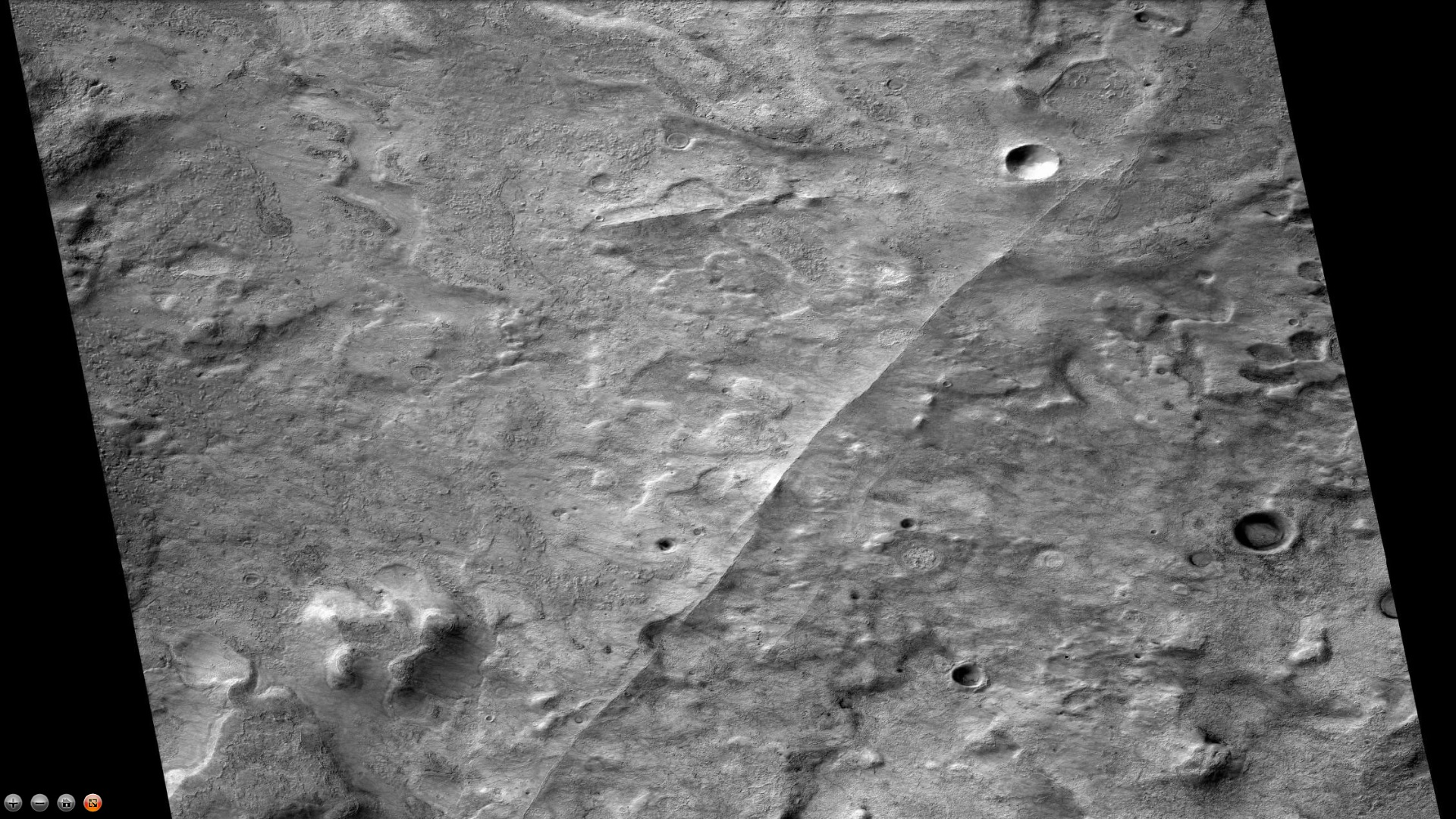
Possible dikes on floor of Copernicus Crater, as seen by CTX camera (on Mars Reconnaissance Orbiter). The straight lines may be dikes, faults, or joints.

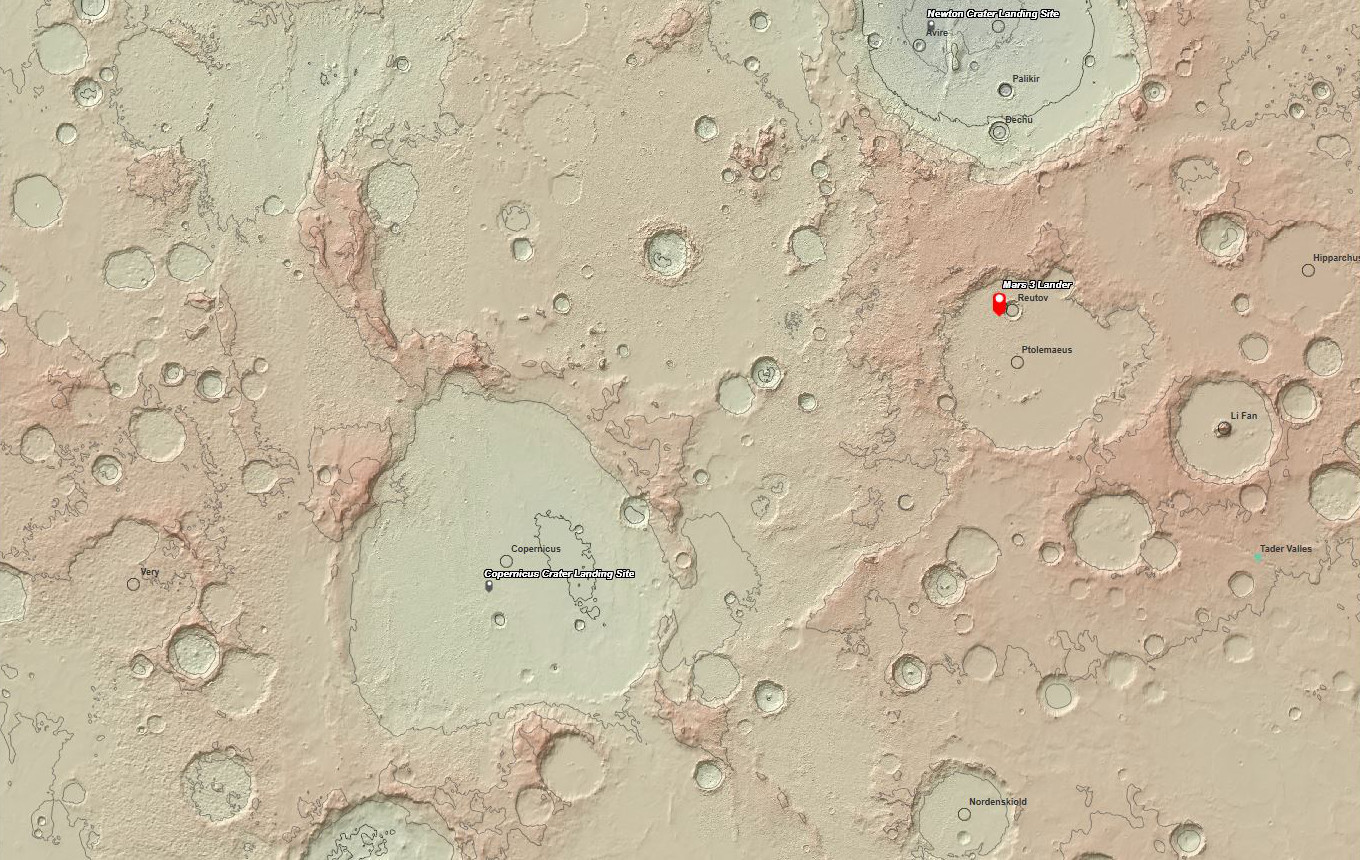
This topographic map was created using Mars Orbiter Laser Altimeter (MOLA) technology on the Mars Global Surveyor spacecraft. This image is a screenshot of RedMapper's website and shows the geographical position of Copernicus crater within the Terra Sirenum region of Mars.

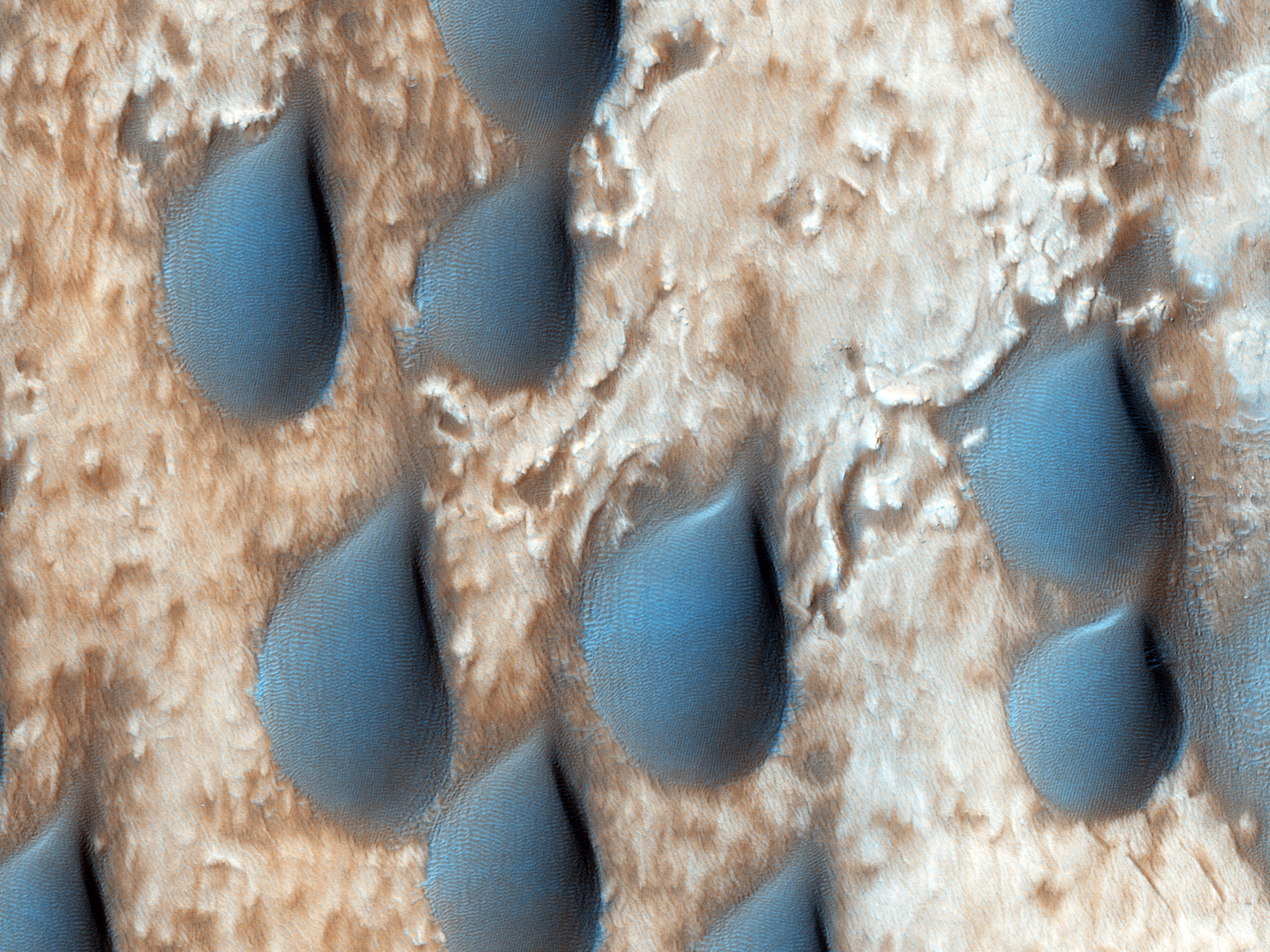
Copernicus crater
olivine sand dune terrain.

== See also ==
- List of craters on Mars
