= Gasa (crater) =

Crater on Mars

Gasa Crater
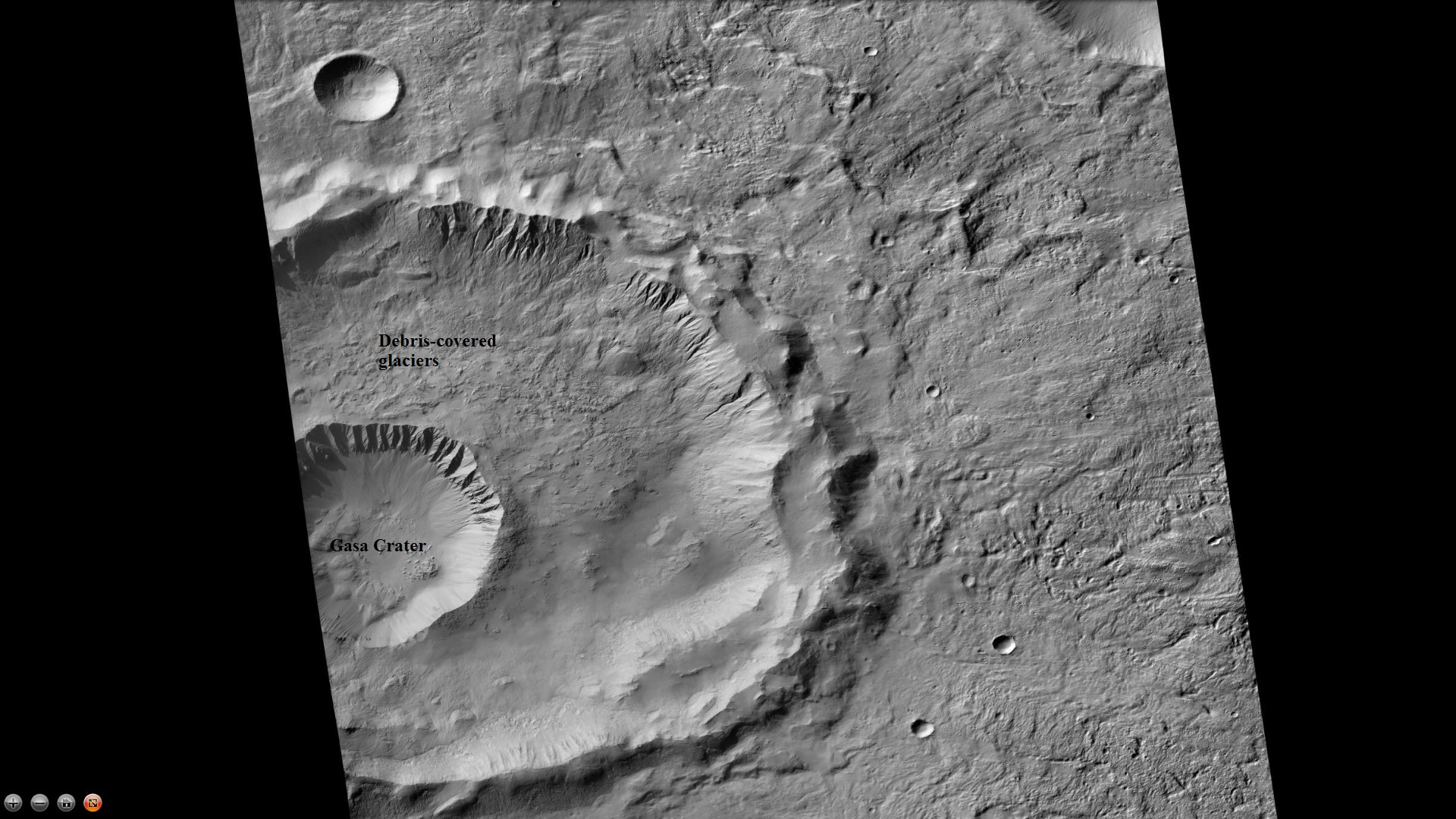
- Gasa Crater, as seen by CTX camera (on Mars Reconnaissance Orbiter). Note: Gasa Crater is the smaller crater and the outer and larger crater is Cilaos. It is believed the impact that created Gasa occurred in a debris-covered glacier.
- Planet: Mars
- Region: Eridania quadrangle
- Coordinates: 35.68°S 129.28°E
- Quadrangle: Eridania
- Diameter: 6.5 km
- Eponym: Gasa, Bhutan

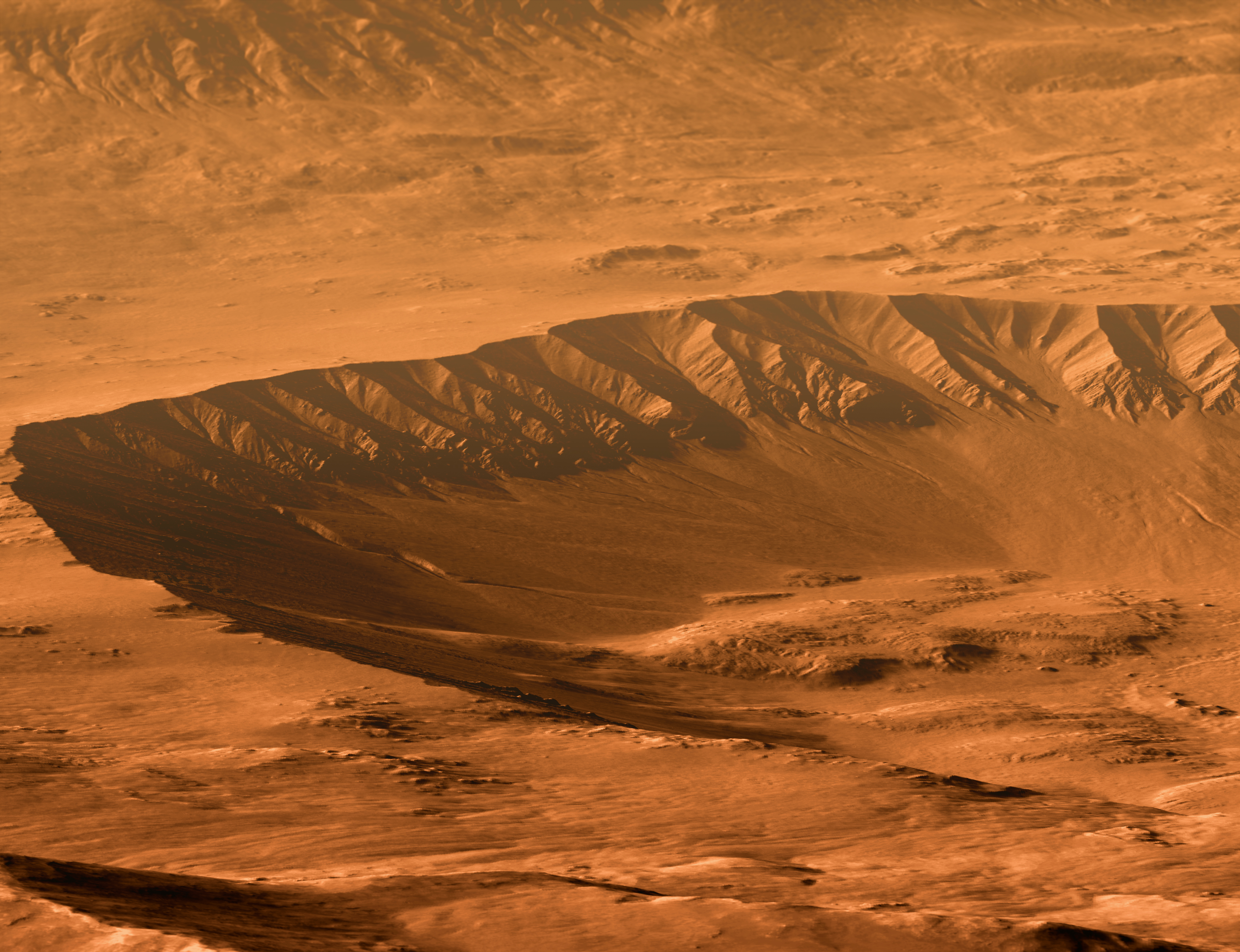
Gullies in Gasa Crater. Image reprocessed from HIRISE data

Gasa is an impact rayed crater in the Eridania quadrangle on Mars at 35.68° S and 230.72° W. and is 6.5 km in diameter. Its name was approved in 2009, and it was named after a place in Bhutan. Gullies are evident in the images. It is now believed that the impact that created Gasa happened in a larger crater whose floor was covered with debris-covered glaciers. The larger crater is known as Cilaos, it is located at 35.71° S and 230.52° W. and is 21.4 km in diameter. Its name was approved on 15 August 2016, and it was named after a place in the island of Réunion.

== Gullies ==
Gasa Crater contains many gullies. Gullies occur on steep slopes, especially on the walls of craters. Gullies are believed to be relatively young because they have few, if any craters. Moreover, they lie on top of sand dunes which themselves are considered to be quite young. Usually, each gully has an alcove, channel, and apron. Some studies have found that gullies occur on slopes that face all directions, others have found that the greater number of gullies are found on poleward facing slopes, especially from 30-44 S.

For years, many believed that gullies were formed by running water, but further observations demonstrate that they may be formed by frozen carbon dioxide (dry ice). Recent studies describe using the High Resolution Imaging Science Experiment (HiRISE) camera on MRO to examine gullies at 356 sites, starting in 2006. Thirty-eight of the sites showed active gully formation. Before-and-after images demonstrated the timing of this activity coincided with seasonal carbon dioxide frost and temperatures that would not have allowed for liquid water. When dry ice frost changes to a gas, it may lubricate dry material to flow especially on steep slopes. In some years frost, perhaps as thick as 1 meter, triggers avalanches. This frost contains mostly dry ice, but also has tiny amounts of water ice.

== See also ==
- List of craters on Mars
- Gullies on Mars
