= Egidio Forcellini =

Italian philologist (1688–1768)

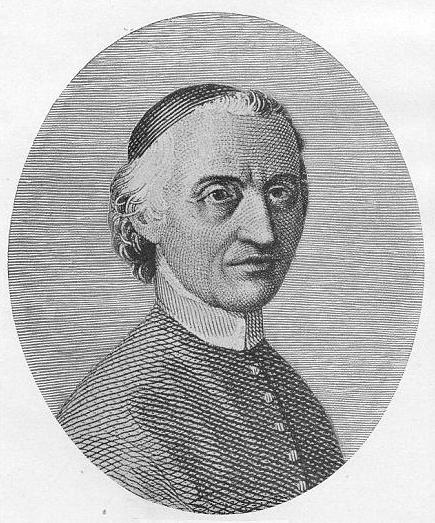
- Born: 26 August 1688; Alano di Piave, Republic of Venice
- Died: 5 April 1768 (aged 79); Alano di Piave, Republic of Venice
- Occupation: Philologist
- Notable work: Latin Lexicon

Egidio Forcellini (26 August 1688 – 5 April 1768) was an Italian philologist.

== Biography ==
Forcellini was born at Fener in the district of Treviso and belonged to a very poor family. He went to the seminary at Padua in 1704, studied under Facciolati, and in due course attained the priesthood. From 1724 to 1730 he held the office of rector of the seminary at Ceneda, and from 1731 to 1765 that of father confessor in the seminary of Padua. The remaining years of his life were mainly spent in his native village.

He died at his home in Fener, in the area of Alano di Piave, in 1768, before the completion of the major work on which he had long collaborated with Facciolati. This was the vast Latin Lexicon, which formed the basis of all similar works subsequently published until the Thesaurus Linguae Latinae. He was engaged with his Herculean task for nearly thirty-five years, and the transcription of the manuscript by Luigi Violato occupied eight years more.

== Bibliography ==
- Totius Latinitatis lexicon, consilio et cura Jacobi Facciolati opera et studio Aegidii Forcellini, lucubratum. Patavii: typis Seminarii, 4 voll., 1771
- Totius Latinitatis lexicon, consilio et cura Jacobi Facciolati opera et studio Aegidii Forcellini lucubratum; in hac tertia editione auctum et emendatum a Josepho Furlanetto. Patavii: typis Seminarii, 4 voll., 1827-1831
- Totius latinitatis lexicon, opera et studio Aegidii Forcellini lucubratum; et in hac editione post tertiam auctam et emendatam a Josepho Furlanetto alumno seminarii patavini novo ordine digestum amplissime auctum atque emendatum cura et studio Vincentii De Vit. Prati: Typis Aldinianis, 1858-1879
- Lexicon totius latinitatis J. Facciolati, Aeg. Forcellini et J. Furlanetti seminarii patavini alumnorum cura, opera et studio lucubratum nunc demum juxta opera R. Klotz, G. Freund, L. Doderlein aliorumque recentiorum auctius, emendatius melioremque in formam redactum curante doct. Francisco Corradini ejusdem seminarii alumno. Patavii: Typis Seminarii, 1896
