= Raffaele Zovenzoni =

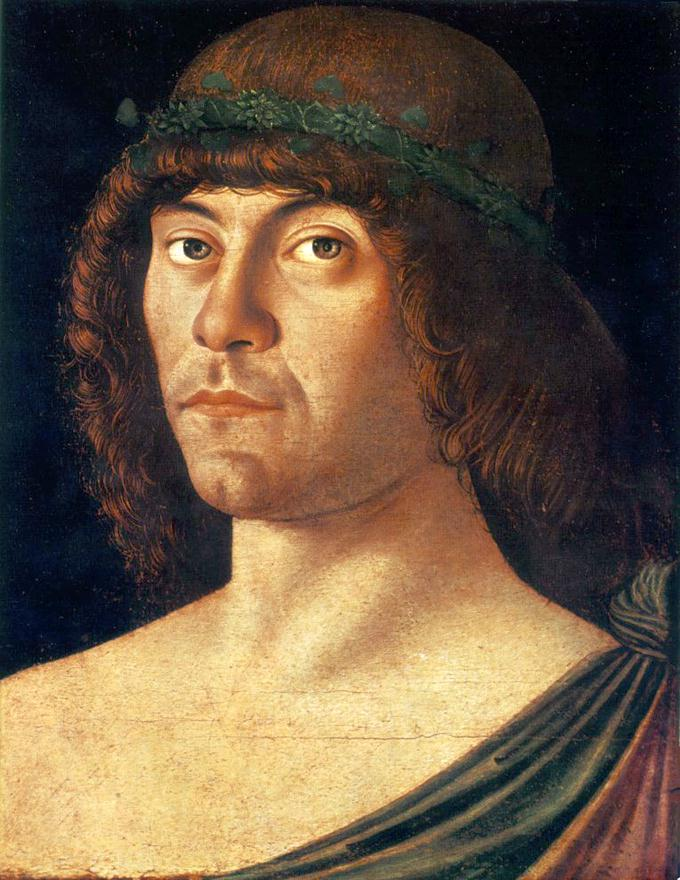
Portrait of Zovenzoni by Giovanni Bellini

Raffaele Zovenzoni (1431 – circa 1484) was an Italian humanist and writer.

He was born in Trieste, and received his early education. He then studied law at Padua. He studied under Guarino da Verona, and thereafter taught in Capo d'Istria (now Koper), where he was patronized by the proveditore of Venice, Marcello. He also lived in Trieste (1466–1470). He was prompted by Johannes Hinderbach, Prince-Bishop of Trent, to write an antisemitic hymn about Simon of Trent.
