= Carlo Malagola =

Italian historian (1855–1910)

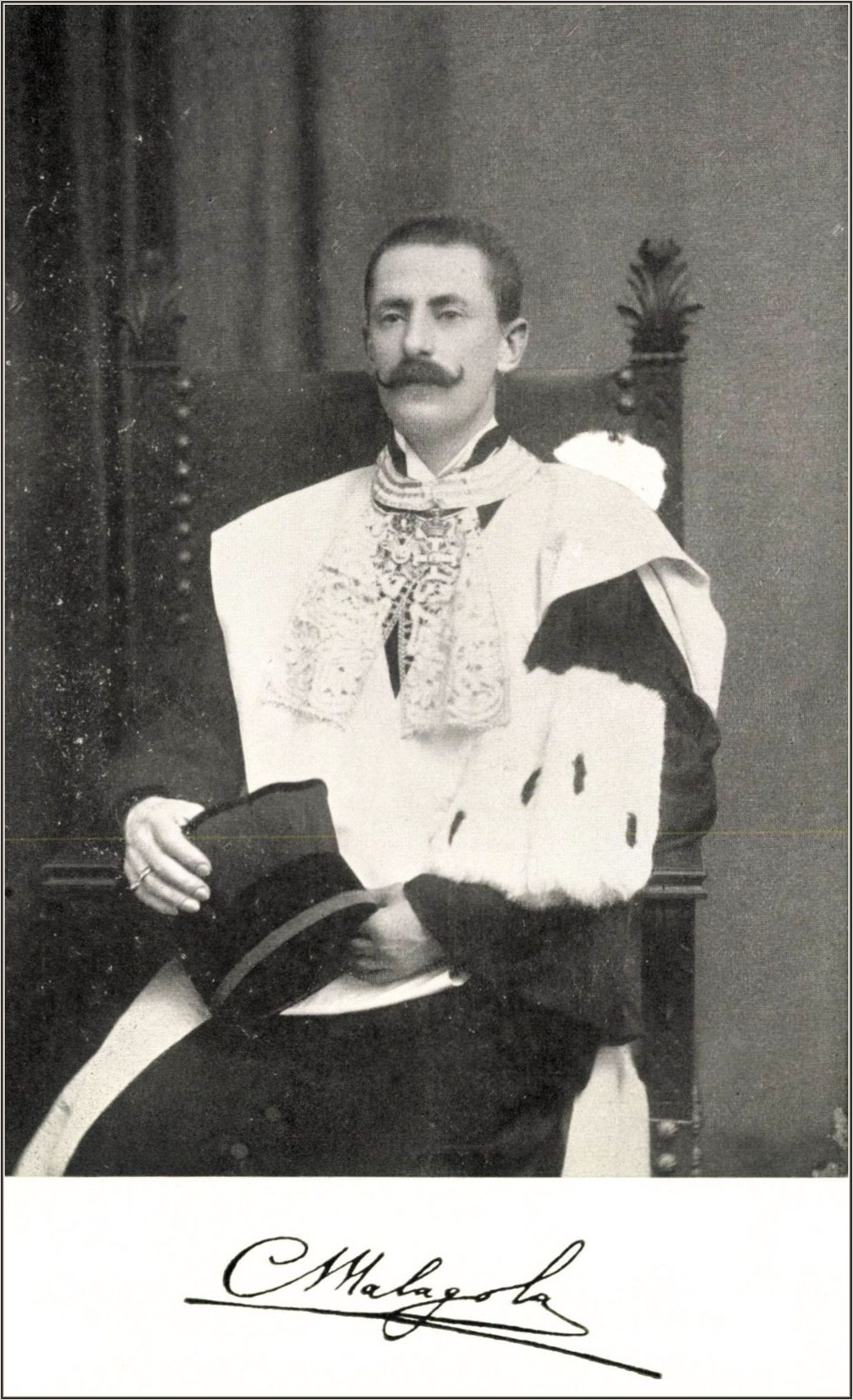
Carlo Malagola, MTA emlékbeszédek, 1911

Carlo Malagola (5 August 1855, in Ravenna – 23 October 1910, in Venice) was a 19th-century Italian historian.

Among others, he studied the archives of Bologna, and the life of Antonio Urceo (Antonius Urceus), called Codro (1446–1500), who had taught Greek to Nicolaus Copernicus. Malagola discovered that according to the note Dominus Nicolaus Kopperlingk de Thorn - IX grossetos the young Prussian had enrolled in the Acta nationis Germanorum at Bologna in 1496 for the fee of 9 Groschen.

Malagola also revealed that the librarian Niccolò Comneno Papadopoli in Padua had falsely claimed in 1726 that he had seen an entry of Copernicus in records of a "Polish nation" at the university. In the century that had passed since, this claim had been widely published and "found a place in all subsequent biographies of Copernicus, but the decorative particulars added by the historian of the Patavian university have been shown to be wholly incorrect" and utterly baseless.

== Works ==
- Carlo Malagola, Mauro Sarti, Mauro Fattorini, Cesare Albicini: De claris Archigymnasii bononiensis professoribus a saeculo XI usque ad ... (Ex officina regiafratrum Merlani, 1896)
- Carlo Malagola: Della vita e delle opere di Antonio Urceo detto Codro: studi e ricerche (Fava e Garagnani, 1878)
- at openlibrary.org
- at archive.org
