= Leopold Prowe =

German historian (1821–1887)

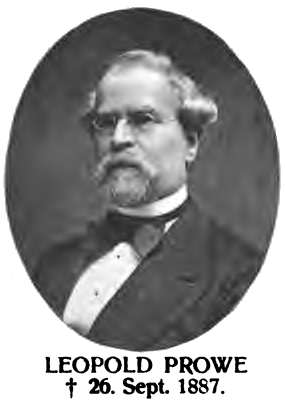
Leopold Prowe

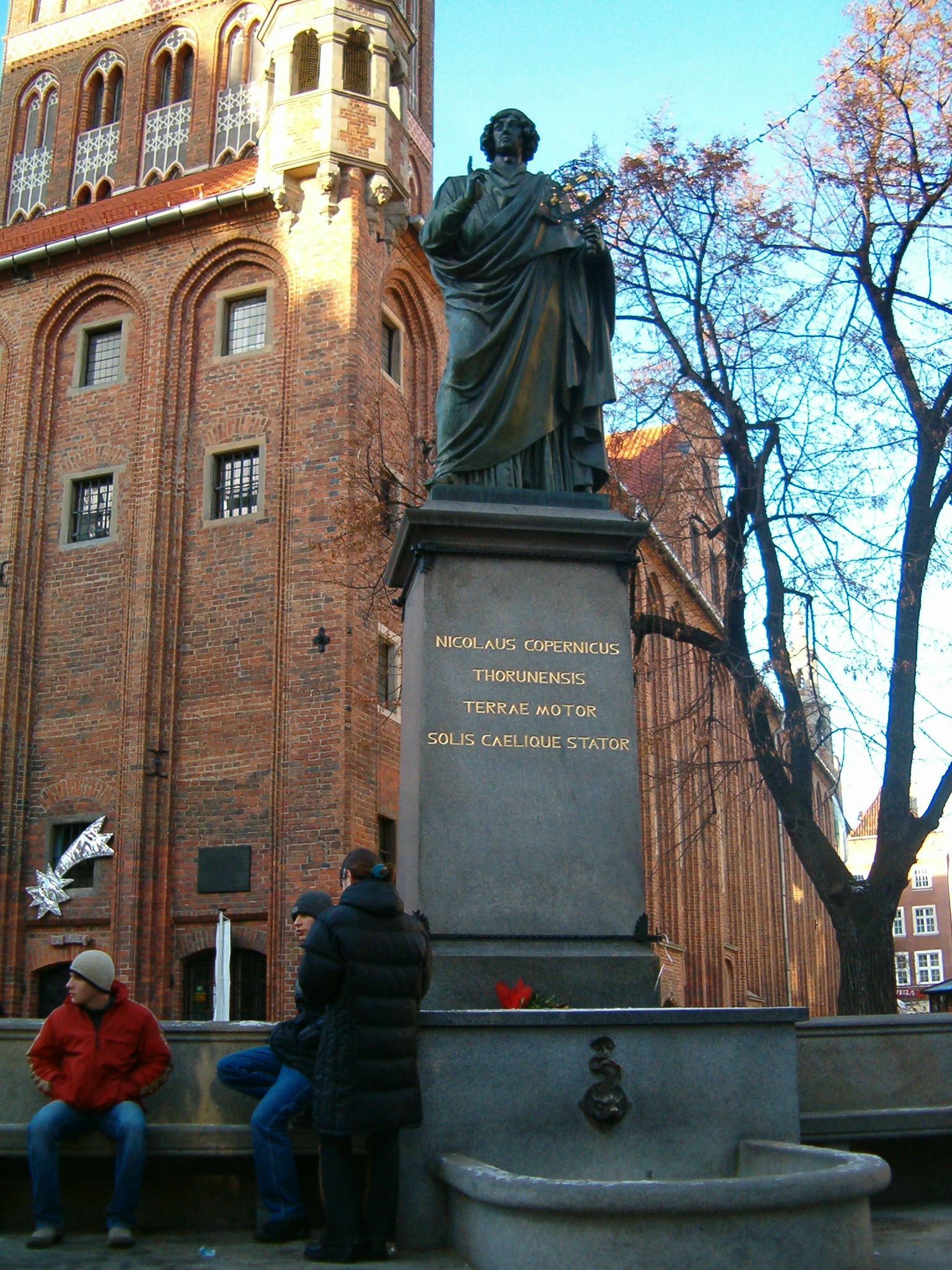
The Monument to Copernicus erected 1853 in Thorn

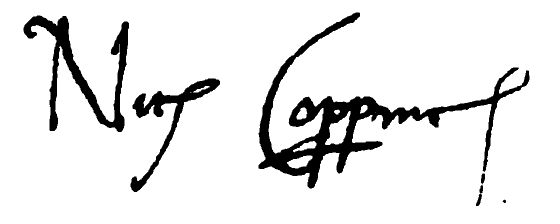
Nicolaus Coppernicus

Leopold Friedrich Prowe (14 October 1821 – 26 September 1887) was a German historian and gymnasium instructor, born as the son of a town councillor of Thorn in West Prussia (now in Poland), the town where in 1473 the astronomer Nicolaus Copernicus was born. Prowe compiled a comprehensive German language biography of Copernicus, titled Nicolaus Coppernicus.

== Life ==
Prowe studied in Leipzig and Berlin and then returned home to become a teacher at the gymnasium of Thorn. In 1839, a local "monument committee" had been founded with the intention to erect a monument, which was created by Friedrich Tieck of Berlin, and erected posthumously in 1853. The activities then continued in a society for science and arts, called Coppernicus-Verein für Wissenschaft und Kunst zu Thorn, headed by Prowe for many years.

== Work ==
Prowe researched the local archives of Copernicus' birthplace, as well as those of other towns in Prussia where the astronomer had worked and lived, especially Frauenburg. He also travelled to Krakau, then part of Austria, to Italian cities, and to Upsala in Sweden, where documents and books owned by the astronomer and scientist Copernicus had been abducted to in later wars. He published several reports, contributed to the celebration of the 400th anniversary in 1873, and to the Latin and German edition of de revolutionibus in 1879.

Prowe's biography of the astronomer, published in 1883 and 1884, consists of two volumes, the first (about 970 pages split in two books, before and after the year 1512) describes his life, the second volumes (over 500 pages) focuses on works of the astronomer, works falsely attributed to him, and other documents related.

Prowe's biography is still considered a masterwork:

- "Despite its age and defects, Prowe's still remains the standard biography of Copernicus."
- "As a result of its comprehensive treatment of the stages of Copernicus's life and its cultural, political, and scientific context, the biography by PROWE is regarded as unsurpassed to the present, despite some corrections recommended by more recent biographical research.

Copernicus' nationality has since long been a source of argument between Germans and Poles. Viewed in Poland as one of the nation's greatest figures, Germans also consider the man to be one of their own. Leopold Prowe contributed to the view that Copernicus had German origins.
