= Jean-Léon Gérôme =

French painter and sculptor (1824–1904)

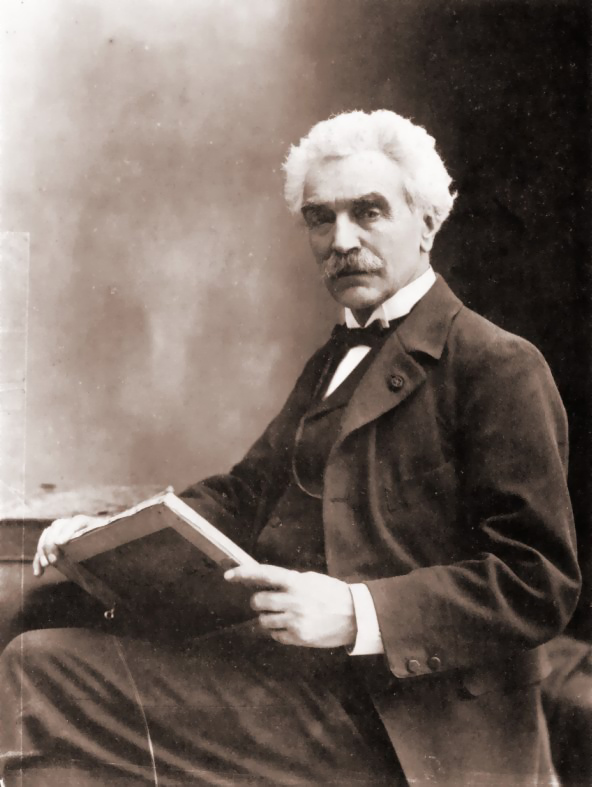
- Photograph by Nadar
- Born: 11 May 1824; Vesoul, Haute-Saône, France
- Died: 10 January 1904 (aged 79); Paris, France
- Resting place: Montmartre Cemetery, Paris
- Education: Paul Delaroche, Charles Gleyre
- Known for: Painting, sculpture, teaching
- Notable work: Pollice Verso
- Movement: Academicism, Orientalism

Signature
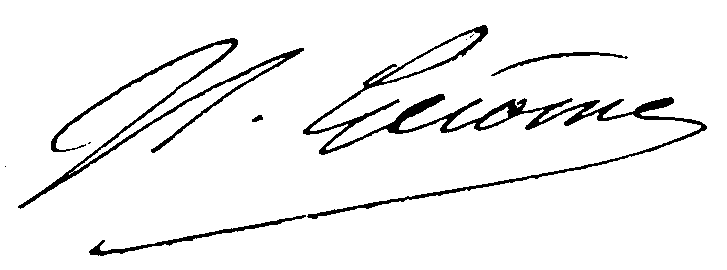

Jean-Léon Gérôme (French: [ʒɑ̃leɔ̃ ʒeʁom]; 11 May 1824 – 10 January 1904) was a French painter and sculptor in the style now known as academicism. His paintings were so widely reproduced that he was "arguably the world's most famous living artist by 1880." The range of his works includes historical paintings, Greek mythology, Orientalism, portraits, and other subjects. Gérôme is considered among the most important painters from the academic period and was, with Meissonier and Cabanel, one of "the three most successful artists of the Second Empire".

He was also a teacher with a long list of students, including Mary Cassatt, Thomas Eakins, Edwin Lord Weeks and Osman Hamdi Bey, among others.

== Early life ==
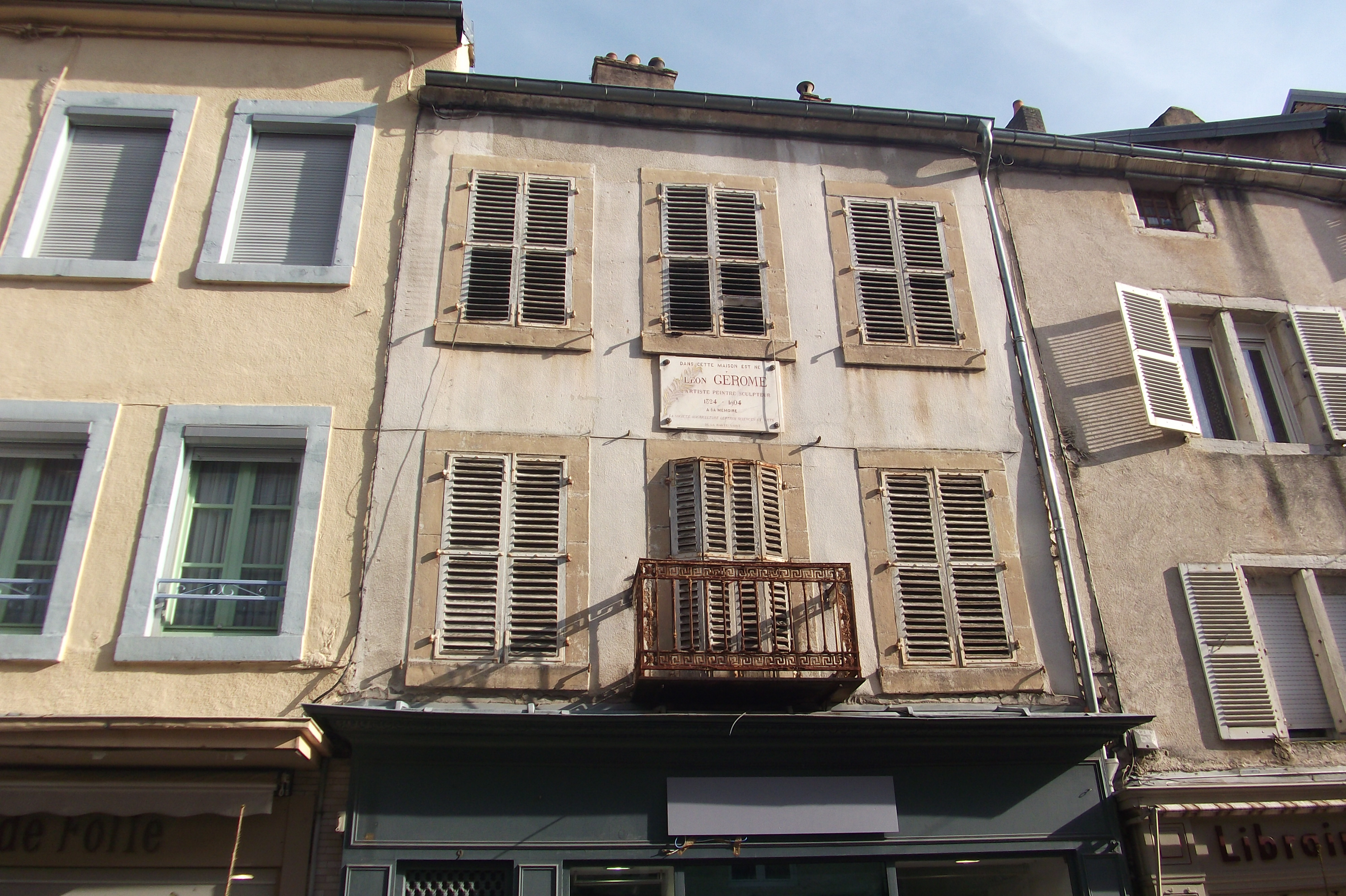
Birthplace of Jean-Léon Gérôme in Vesoul, France

Jean-Léon Gérôme was born at Vesoul, Haute-Saône. It was here that Gérôme first received instruction in drawing during his youth in school. He was instructed by local artist and teacher Claude-Basile Cariage, under whom he produced work of sufficient quality to merit more auspicious tutelage. In 1840 he was sent to Paris at the age of 16 where he studied under Paul Delaroche, whom he later accompanied to Italy in 1843. He visited Florence, Rome, the Vatican and Pompeii. On his return to Paris in 1844, like many students of Delaroche, he joined the atelier of Charles Gleyre and studied there for a brief time. He then attended the École des Beaux-Arts. In 1846 he tried to enter the prestigious Prix de Rome, but failed in the final stage because his figure drawing was inadequate.

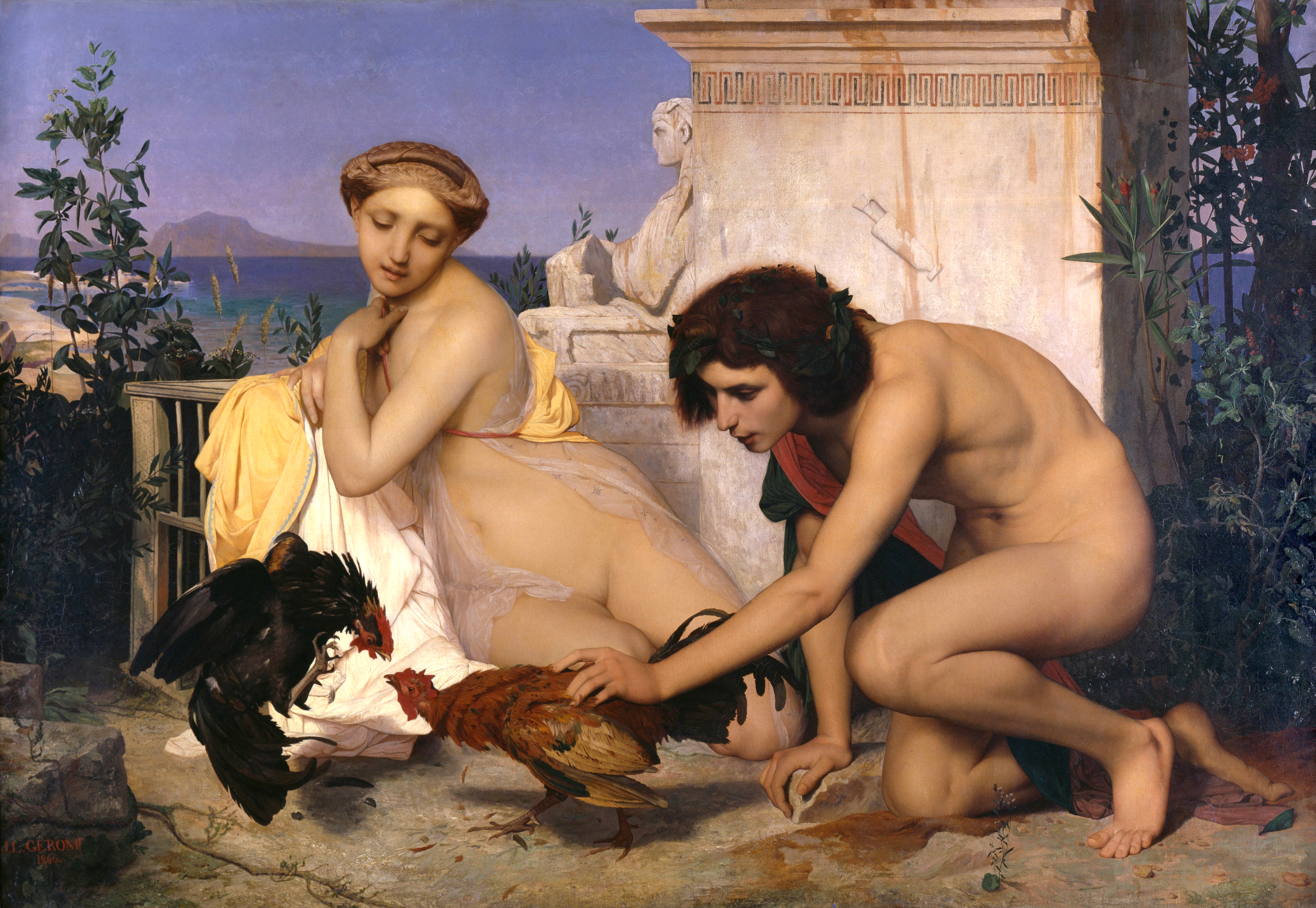
The Cock Fight (1846; Musée d'Orsay, Paris)

His painting The Cock Fight (1846) is an academic exercise depicting a nude young man and a very thinly draped young woman with two fighting cocks, with the Bay of Naples in the background. He sent this painting to the Paris Salon of 1847, where it gained him a third-class medal. This work was seen as the epitome of the Neo-Grec movement that had formed out of Gleyre's studio (including Henri-Pierre Picou and Jean-Louis Hamon), and was championed by the influential French critic Théophile Gautier, whose review made Gérôme famous and effectively launched his career.

Gérôme abandoned his dream of winning the Prix de Rome and took advantage of his sudden success. His paintings The Virgin, the Infant Jesus and Saint John and Anacreon, Bacchus and Eros took a second-class medal at the Paris Salon of 1848. In 1849, he produced the paintings Michelangelo (also called In his Studio) and A Portrait of a Lady.

In 1851, he decorated a vase later offered by Emperor Napoleon III to Prince Albert, now part of the Royal Collection at St. James's Palace, London. He exhibited Greek Interior, Souvenir d'Italie, Bacchus and Love, Drunk in 1851; Paestum in 1852; and An Idyll in 1853.

== Important commissions ==
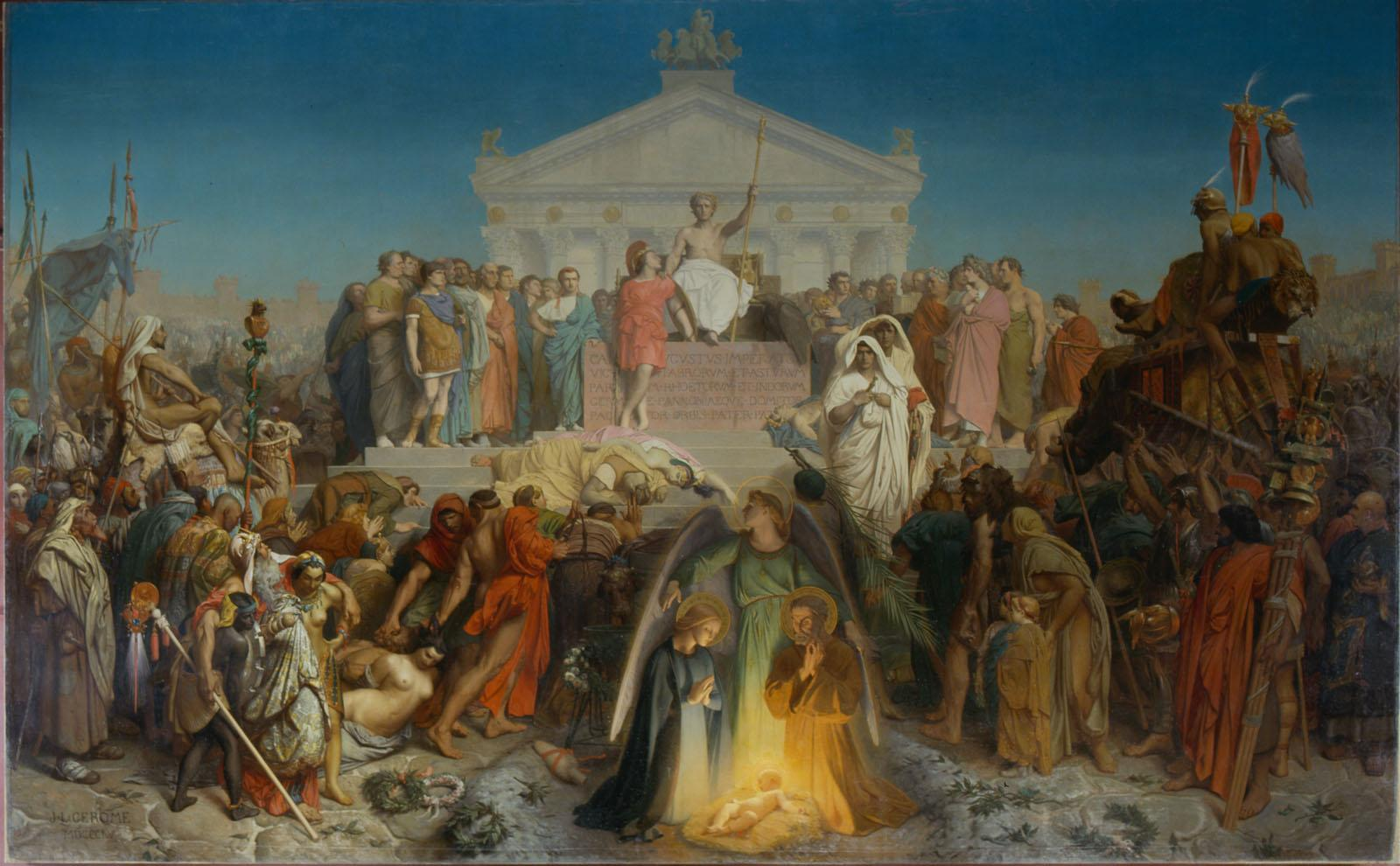
The Age of Augustus, the Birth of Christ, c. 1852–1854, Musée de Picardie

In 1852, Gérôme received a commission to paint a large mural of an allegorical subject of his choosing. The Age of Augustus, the Birth of Christ, which combined the birth of Christ with conquered nations paying homage to Augustus, may have been intended to flatter Napoleon III, whose government commissioned the mural and who was identified as a "new Augustus." A considerable down payment enabled Gérôme to travel and research, first in 1853 to Constantinople, together with the actor Edmond Got, and in 1854 to Greece and Turkey and the shores of the Danube, where he was present at a concert of Russian conscripts making music under the threat of a lash.

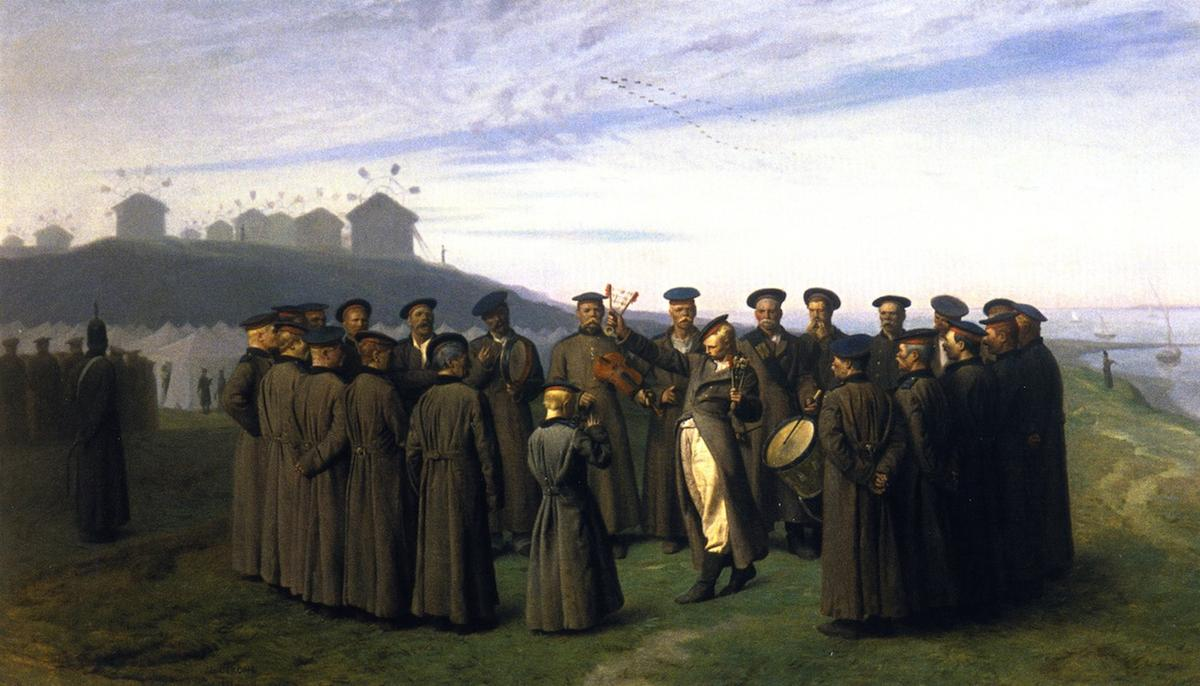
Recreation in a Russian Camp, 1855

In 1853, Gérôme moved to the Boîte à Thé, a group of studios in the Rue Notre-Dame-des-Champs, Paris. This became a meeting place for artists, writers and actors, where George Sand entertained the composers: Hector Berlioz, Johannes Brahms and Gioachino Rossini and the novelists Théophile Gautier and Ivan Turgenev.

In 1854, he completed another important commission, decorating the Chapel of St. Jerome in the church of St. Séverin in Paris. His Last Communion of St. Jerome in this chapel reflects the influence of the school of Ingres on his religious works.

To the Salon of 1855 during the Universal Exhibition he contributed Pifferaro, Shepherd, and The Age of Augustus, the Birth of Christ, but it was the modest painting Recreation in a Russian Camp that garnered the most attention.

== Orientalism ==
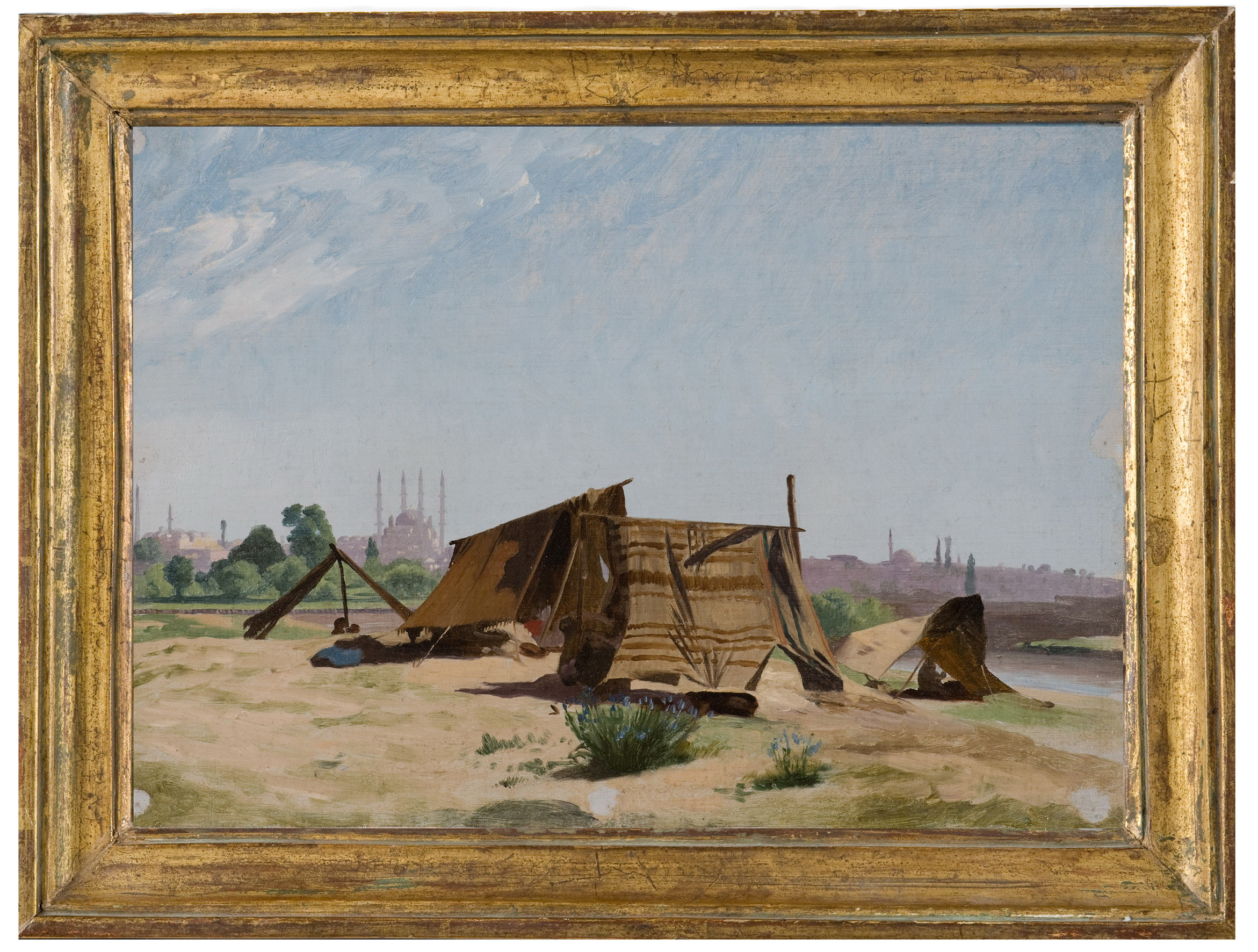
Encampment near Constantinople, 1878, an example of Gérôme's plein-air oil sketches, Ger Eenens Collection, The Netherlands

In 1856, Gérôme visited Egypt for the first time. His itinerary followed the classic Grand Tour of the Near East, up the Nile to Cairo, across to Faiyum, then further up the Nile to Abu Simbel, then back to Cairo, across the Sinai Peninsula through Sinai and up the Wadi el-Araba to Jerusalem and finally Damascus. This heralded the start of many Orientalist paintings depicting Arab religious practice, genre scenes and North African landscapes.

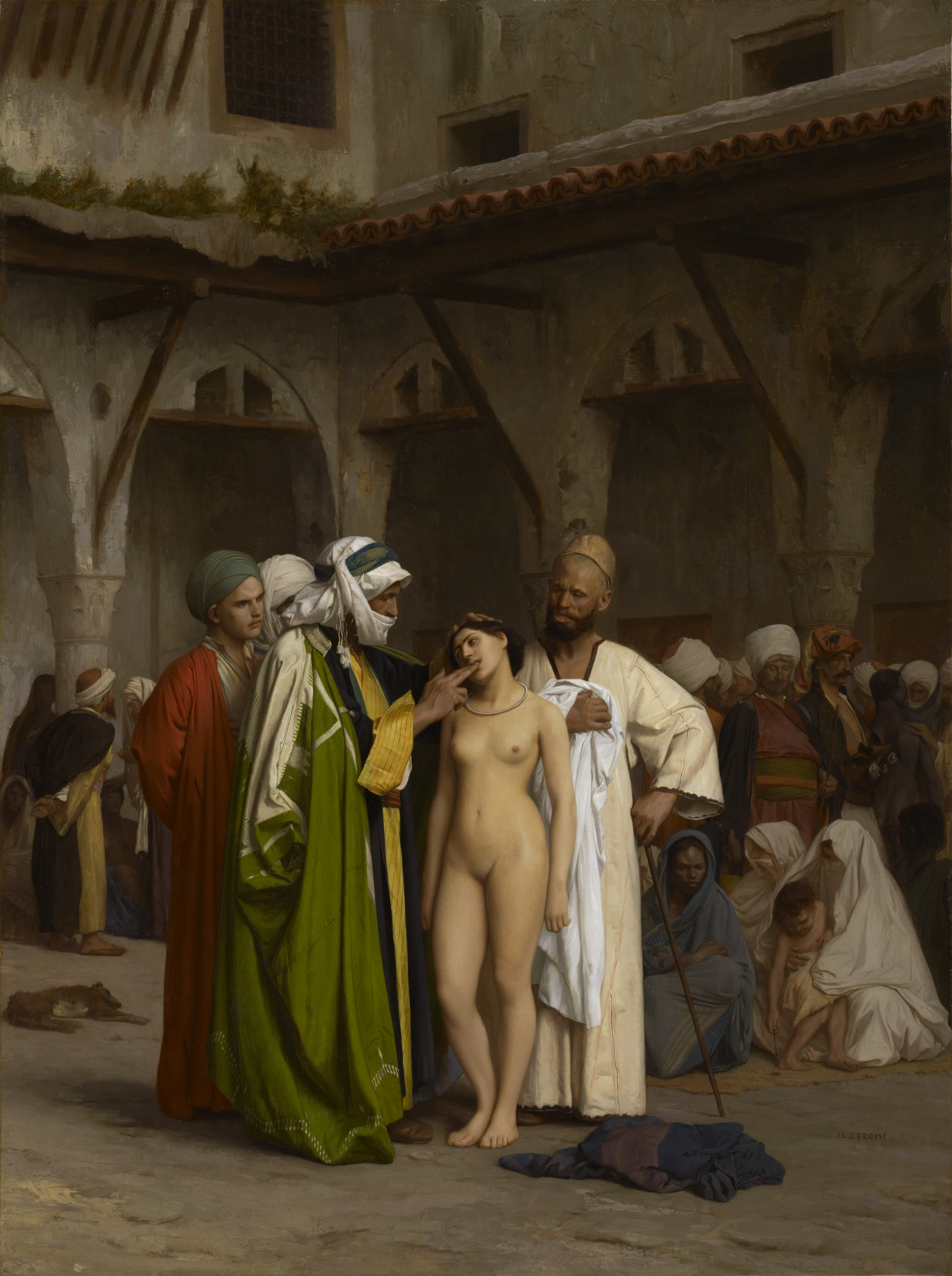
The Slave Market, c. 1866, Clark Art Institute. Gérôme executed a very similar painting in 1857, in an ancient Greek or Roman setting.

Among these are paintings in which the Oriental setting is combined with depictions of female nudity. The Slave Market, The Great Bath at Bursa, Pool in a Harem, and similar subjects were works of imagination in which Gérôme combined accurately observed Middle Eastern architectural details with idealized nudes painted in his Paris studio. (In 2019, the right wing populist party, Alternative for Germany, used The Slave Market in a campaign poster in the 2019 European Parliament election.)

In his travels, Gérôme collected artefacts and costumes for staging oriental scenes in the studio, and also made oil studies from nature for the backgrounds. In an autobiographical essay of 1878, Gérôme described how important oil sketches made on the spot were for him: "Even when worn out after long marches under the bright sun, as soon as our camping spot was reached I got down to work with concentration. But Oh! How many things were left behind of which I carried only the memory away! And I prefer three touches of color on a piece of canvas to the most vivid memory, but one had to continue on with some regret."

Gérôme's reputation was greatly enhanced at the Paris Salon of 1857 by his display of Egyptian Recruits Crossing the Desert, Memnon and Sesostris, Camels Watering, and Suite d'un bal masqué (purchased by the duc d'Aumale, now in the Musée Condé in Chantilly; a copy made by Gérôme in 1859, The Duel After the Masquerade, is in the Walters Art Museum).

== Return to Classical subjects ==
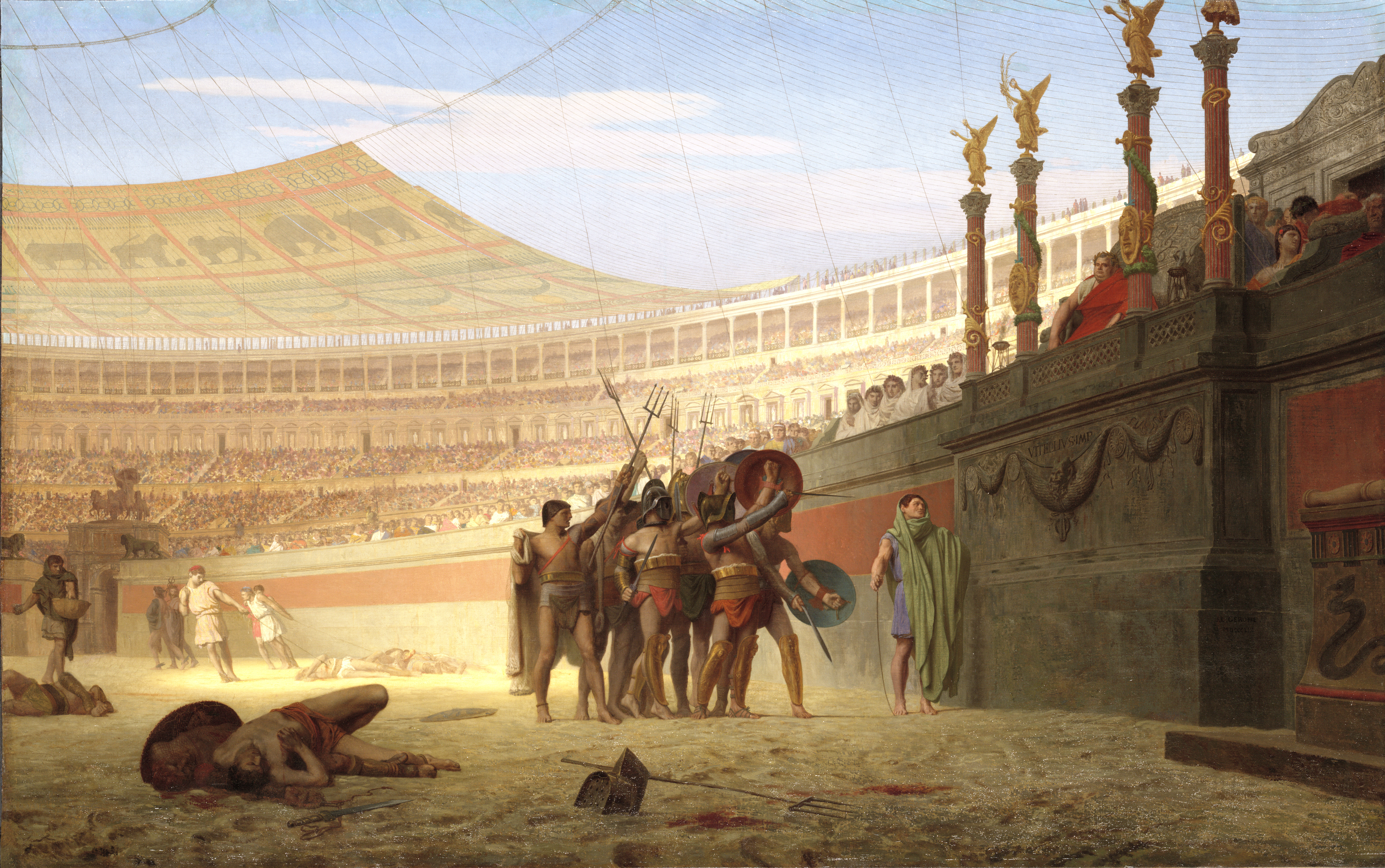
Ave Caesar! Morituri te Salutant, 1859, Yale University Art Gallery

In 1858, he helped to decorate the Paris house of Prince Napoléon Joseph Charles Paul Bonaparte in the Pompeian style. The prince had bought his Greek Interior (1850), a depiction of a brothel also in the Pompeian manner.

In Ave Caesar! Morituri te Salutant, shown at the Salon of 1859, Gérôme returned to the painting of Classical subjects, but the picture failed to interest the public. King Candaules (1859) and Phryne Before the Areopagus and Socrates Seeking Alcibiades in the House of Aspasia (both 1861) gave rise to some scandal by reason of the subjects selected by the painter, and inspired bitter attacks by Paul de Saint-Victor and Maxime Du Camp. Also at the 1861 Salon he exhibited Egyptian Chopping Straw and Rembrandt Biting an Etching, two very minutely finished works.

In 1863, he married Marie Goupil (1842–1912), the daughter of the international art dealer Adolphe Goupil. They had four daughters and one son. His oldest daughter was Jeanne (1863–1944) and she was followed by Suzanne (1867–1941; married to Aimé Morot), Blanche (1868–1918) and Madeleine (1875–1905). Upon his marriage he moved to a house in the Rue de Bruxelles, close to the Folies Bergère. He expanded it into a grand house with stables with a sculpture studio below and a painting studio on the top floor.

== Atelier at École des Beaux-Arts ==
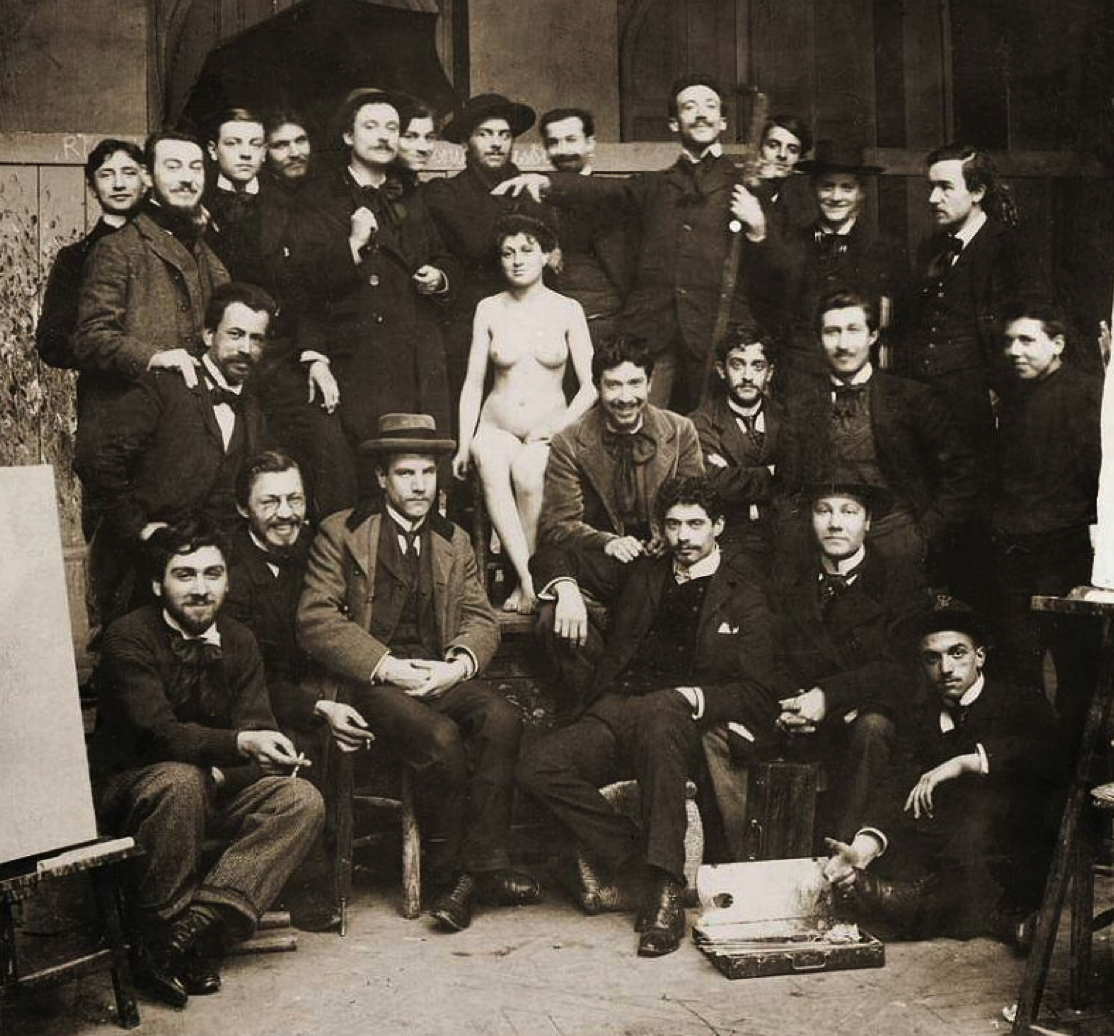
Students and model, believed to be one of Gérome's classes at the École des Beaux-Arts

Gérôme was appointed as one of the three professors at the École des Beaux-Arts. He started with sixteen students. Between 1864 and 1904, more than 2,000 students received at least some of their art education through Gérôme's atelier at the École des Beaux-Arts. Places in Gérôme's atelier were limited, keenly sought and highly competitive. Only the best students were admitted and aspirants considered it an honour to be selected. Gérôme progressed his students through drawing from antique works, casts and followed by life study with live models generally selected on the basis of their physique, but occasionally for their facial expression in a sequence of exercises known as the academie. Students drew parts of a bust before the entire bust, then parts of the live model before preparing full figures. Only when they had mastered sketching were they permitted to work in oils. They were also taught to draw clearly and correctly before consideration of tonal qualities. In his school, the floor sloped so that students had the fullest view of the model from the rear of the room. Students sat around any model in order of seniority, with the more senior students towards the rear so that they could draw the full figure, while the more junior members sat towards the front and concentrated on the bust or other part of the anatomy.

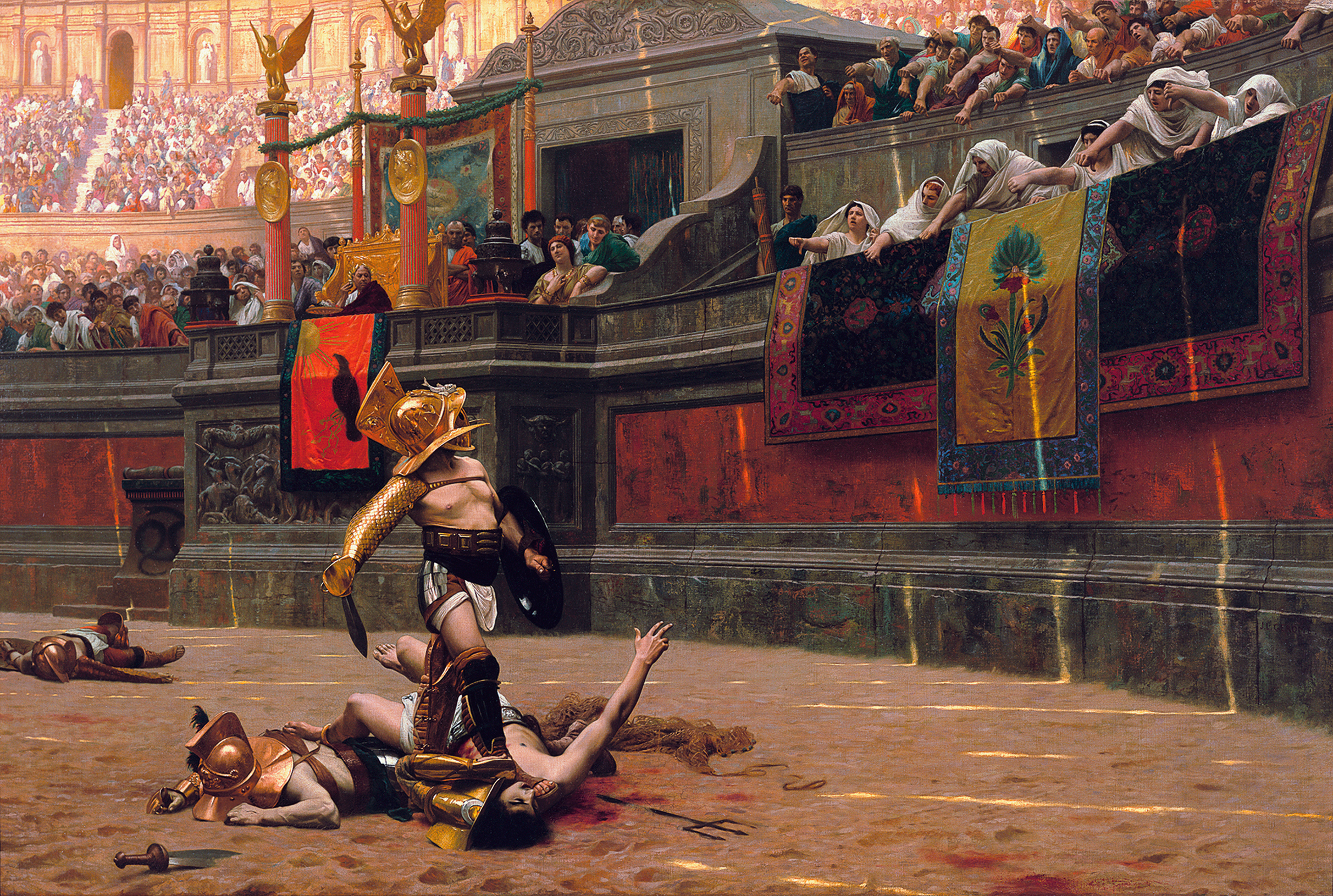
Pollice Verso, 1872, popularized the "thumbs down" gesture; Gérôme's Vestal virgins appear especially bloodthirsty. Phoenix Art Museum.

According to John Milner, who studied with Gérôme, his atelier was the most "riotous" and "lewd" of all the studios at Beaux-Arts. Students were treated to bizarre initiation rites which included slashing each other's canvases, throwing students down stairs, out of windows, and onto upturned stools, staging fencing matches on the model's dais, in the nude and with paintbrushes loaded with paint.

Gérôme attended every Wednesday and Saturday, demanding punctilious attendance to his instructions. His reputation as a severe critic was well-known. One of his American students, Stephen Wilson Van Shaick, commented that Gérôme was "merciless in judgement" yet possessed a "singular magnetism." Although Gérôme was very demanding of his students, he offered them considerable assistance outside Beaux-Arts, inviting them to his personal studio, making recommendations to the Salon on their behalf, and encouraging them to study with his colleagues.

== Honors and mid-career works ==
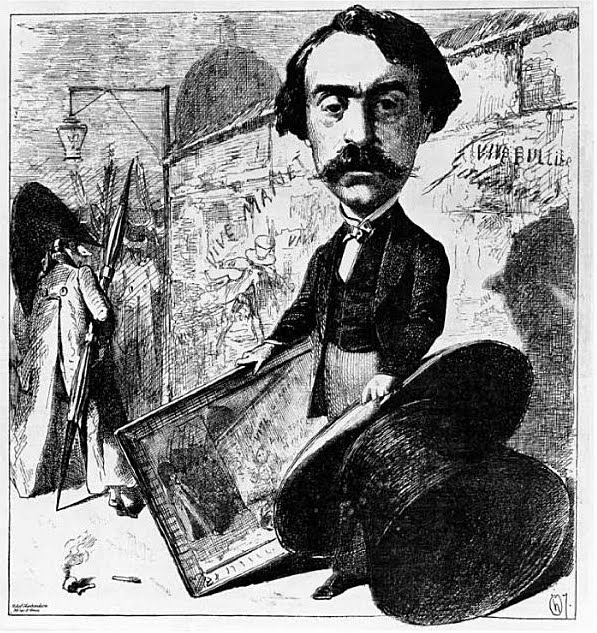
Caricature of Gérôme by Henri Oulevay, commenting on the controversy roused by The Execution of Marshal Ney

Gérôme was elected, on his fifth attempt, a member of the Institut de France in 1865. Already a knight in the Légion d'honneur, he was promoted to an officer in 1867. In 1869, he was elected an honorary member of the British Royal Academy. The King of Prussia, Wilhelm I, awarded him the Grand Order of the Red Eagle, Third Class. His influence became extensive and he was a regular guest of Empress Eugénie at the Imperial Court in Compiègne. Along with the most eminent French artists, he was invited to the opening of the Suez Canal in 1869. The Société des Peintres Orientalistes Français (Society of French Orientalist Painters), founded in 1893, named Gérôme honorary president. Gérôme was elected an International Honorary Member of the American Academy of Arts and Sciences in 1875 and an International Member of the American Philosophical Society in 1895.

The Execution of Marshal Ney was exhibited at the Salon of 1868. On behalf of Ney's descendants, Gérôme was asked to withdraw the painting, but did not comply. The general reception was very split and the 1868 Salon marked the beginning of a lasting divide between Gérôme and many French art critics, who accused him of relying on literary techniques, of commercialising art, and of bringing politics into art. Henri Oulevay made a caricature where Gérôme is depicted in front of the wall with the art critics as the firing squad.

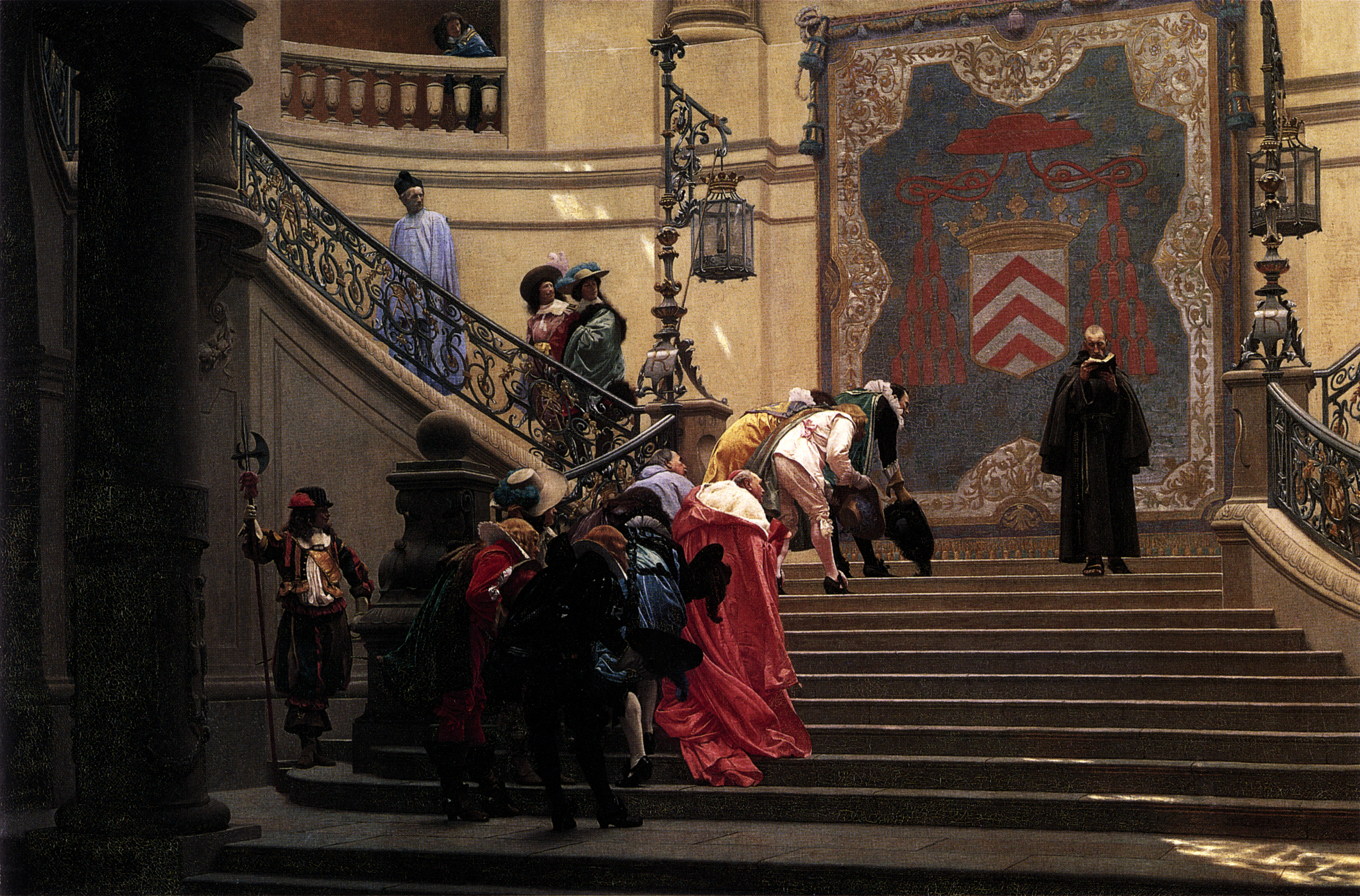
Éminence Grise, 1873, Museum of Fine Arts, Boston

In 1872 Gérôme produced Pollice Verso, a painting of bloody gladiators and blood-thirsty Vestal virgins in the Colosseum that became one of his most famous works. Alexander Turney Stewart purchased the painting from Gérôme at a price of 80,000 francs, setting a new record for the artist. Gérôme's imagery of the turned thumb to signal life or death for a fallen gladiator was repeated in a multitude of movies, from the silent era up to and including the 2000 Oscar-winner Gladiator.

Gérôme returned successfully to the Salon in 1873 with his painting L'Eminence Grise (Museum of Fine Arts, Boston), a colorful depiction of the main stair hall of the palace of Cardinal Richelieu, popularly known as the Red Cardinal (L'Eminence Rouge), who was France's de facto ruler under King Louis XIII beginning in 1624. In the painting, François Leclerc du Tremblay, a Capuchin friar dubbed L'Eminence Grise (the Gray Cardinal), descends the ceremonial staircase immersed in reading the Bible while all others either bow before him or fix their gaze on him. As Richelieu's chief adviser, L'Eminence Grise was called "the power behind the throne," which became the known definition of his title.

From approximately 1876 to 1890, Gérôme frequently worked with model Emma Dupont, who posed for several of his works, including Nude (Emma Dupont) (1876), The End of the Session (1886), Omphale (1887), Working in Marble, or The Artist Sculpting Tanagra (1890), and Tanagra (1890).

== Sculpture ==
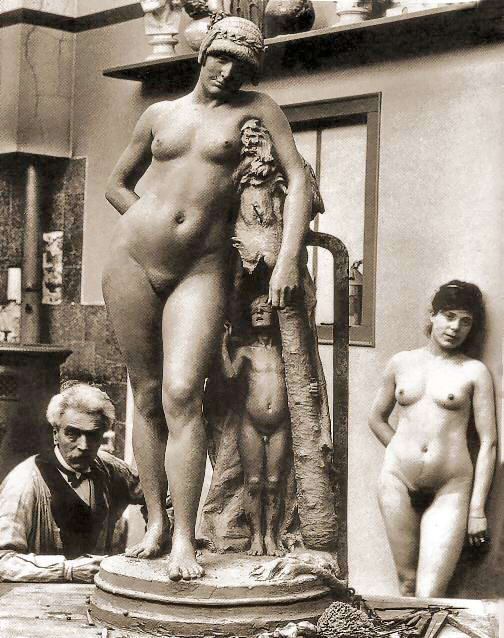
Gérôme with Emma Dupont, the model for Omphale, c. 1885, Bibliothèque Nationale de France

In his thirties, Gérôme took up sculpture. His first work was a large bronze statue of a gladiator holding his foot on his victim, based on his painting Pollice Verso (1872) and shown to the public at the Universal Exhibition of 1878. The same year he exhibited a marble statue at the Salon of 1878, based on his early painting Anacreon, Bacchus and Eros (1848).

Aware of contemporary experiments of tinting marble (such as by those by John Gibson), he produced Dancer with Three Masks combining movement with color, first exhibited in 1902 and now in the Musée des Beaux-Arts de Caen.

Among his other sculptures are Omphale (1887) and the statue of the duc d'Aumale which stands in front of the Château de Chantilly (1899).

He experimented with mixed ingredients, using for his statues tinted marble, bronze and ivory inlaid with precious stones and paste. His Dancer was exhibited in 1891. His lifesize statue Bellona, in ivory, bronze, and gemstones, attracted great attention at the 1892 exhibition in the Royal Academy of London.

Gérôme then began a series of conquerors, wrought in gold, silver and gems: Bonaparte Entering Cairo (1897), Tamerlane (1898), and Frederick the Great (1899).

In 1903 Gérôme executed a two sculpture commission, Metallugical Worker and Metallurgical Science for the American millionaire Charles M. Schwab meant to glorify Steel production. Schwab sent an actual steel worker to Paris to pose for the works.

== Gérôme and Impressionism ==
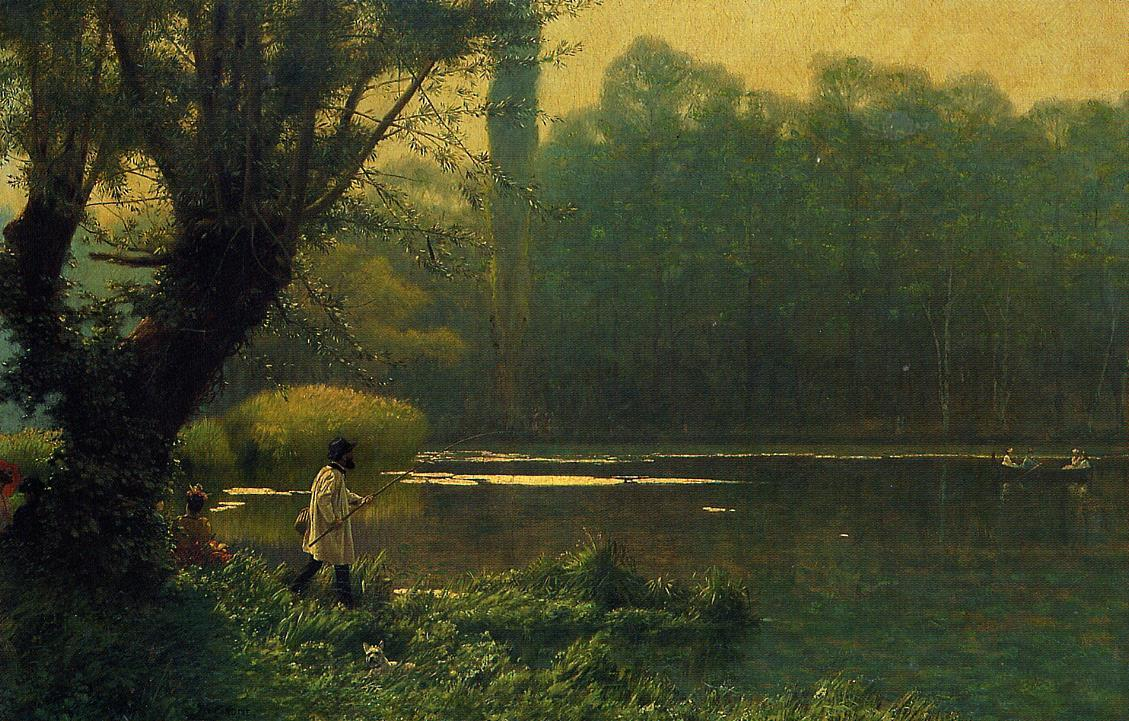
Summer Afternoon on a Lake, c. 1895, private collection

During the last decades of his career, as his own work fell out of fashion, Gérôme was harshly critical of Impressionism. In 1894, he caused a scandal over his opposition to the Caillebotte bequest to the state which eventually became the foundation of the Musée d'Orsay collection. He organized a public demonstration in his atelier and gave interviews to reporters, including these comments published in the journal L'Éclair:

The Institut de France cannot remain still before such a scandal...How can the government dare welcome such a collection of inanities into a museum? Why, have you seen the collection? The state, the ward of such junk!... What lessons are our young artists going to receive from now on? They'll all start to do Impressionism! Ah! these people believe they are painting nature, nature so admirable in all its manifestations! What pretension! Nature is not for them! This Monet, do you remember his cathedrals? And that man used to know how to paint! Yes, I've seen good things by him, but now!

Similarly he objected to the Manet memorial exhibition at the École des Beaux Arts in 1884. But he did attend the opening, after which he paid Manet the backhanded compliment that the exhibition was "not so bad as I thought."

== Late career: the Pygmalion–Tanagra cycle ==
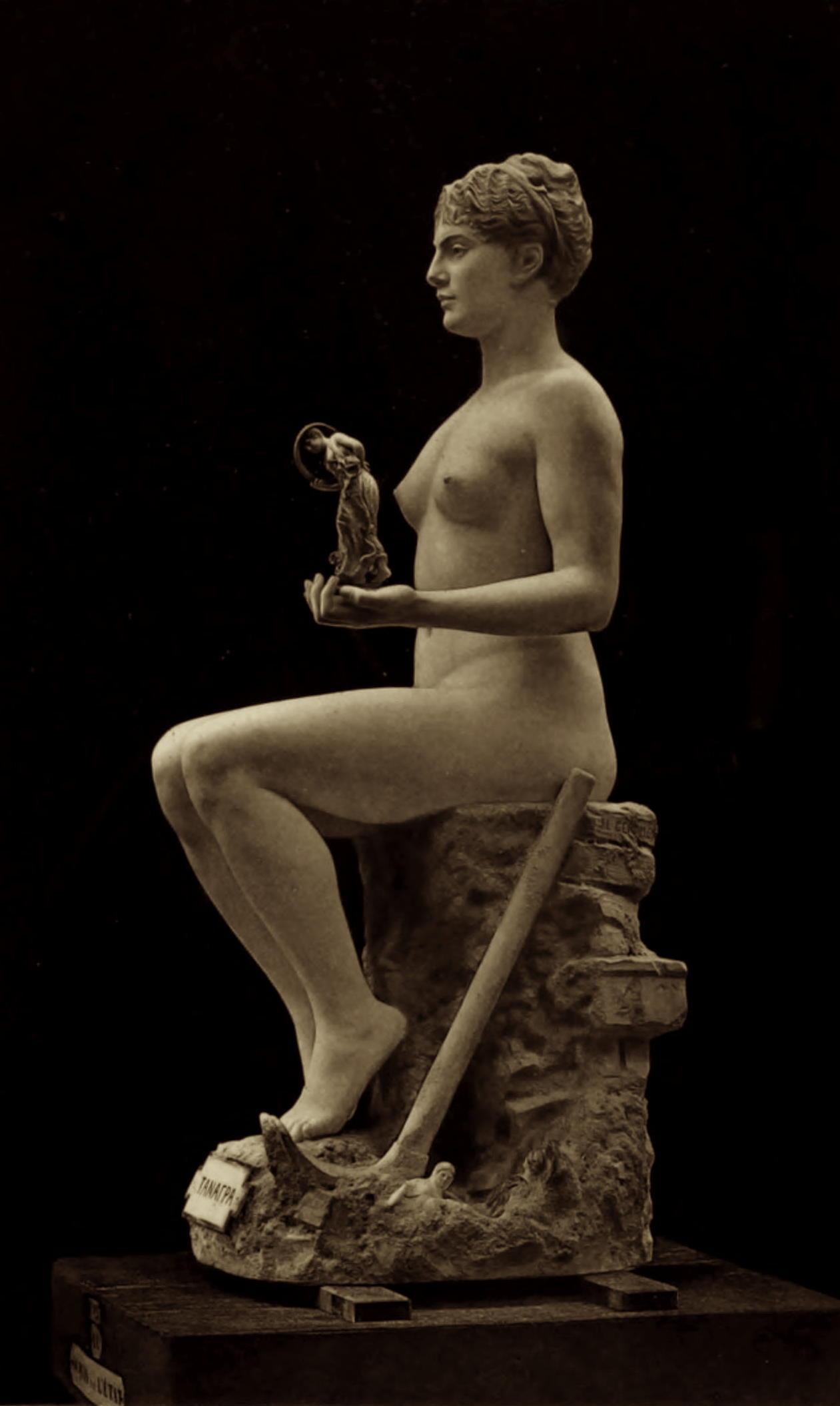
Tanagra, marble, 1890, photogravure Goupil c. 1892, Musée d'Orsay

Beginning in 1890, Gerome again drew inspiration from the ancient world with an interconnected, slyly self-referential series of paintings and sculptures that depicted Pygmalion and Galatea; the spirit of Tanagra; and himself.

In 1890, Gérôme made at least two paintings of the mythical Greek sculptor Pygmalion kissing his statue, Galatea, at the very moment she is transformed from marble into living flesh. The most famous of these paintings titled Pygmalion and Galatea is now in the Metropolitan Museum of Art; it shows the sculptor and his living statue from the rear. A variation (in private hands) shows them from the front.

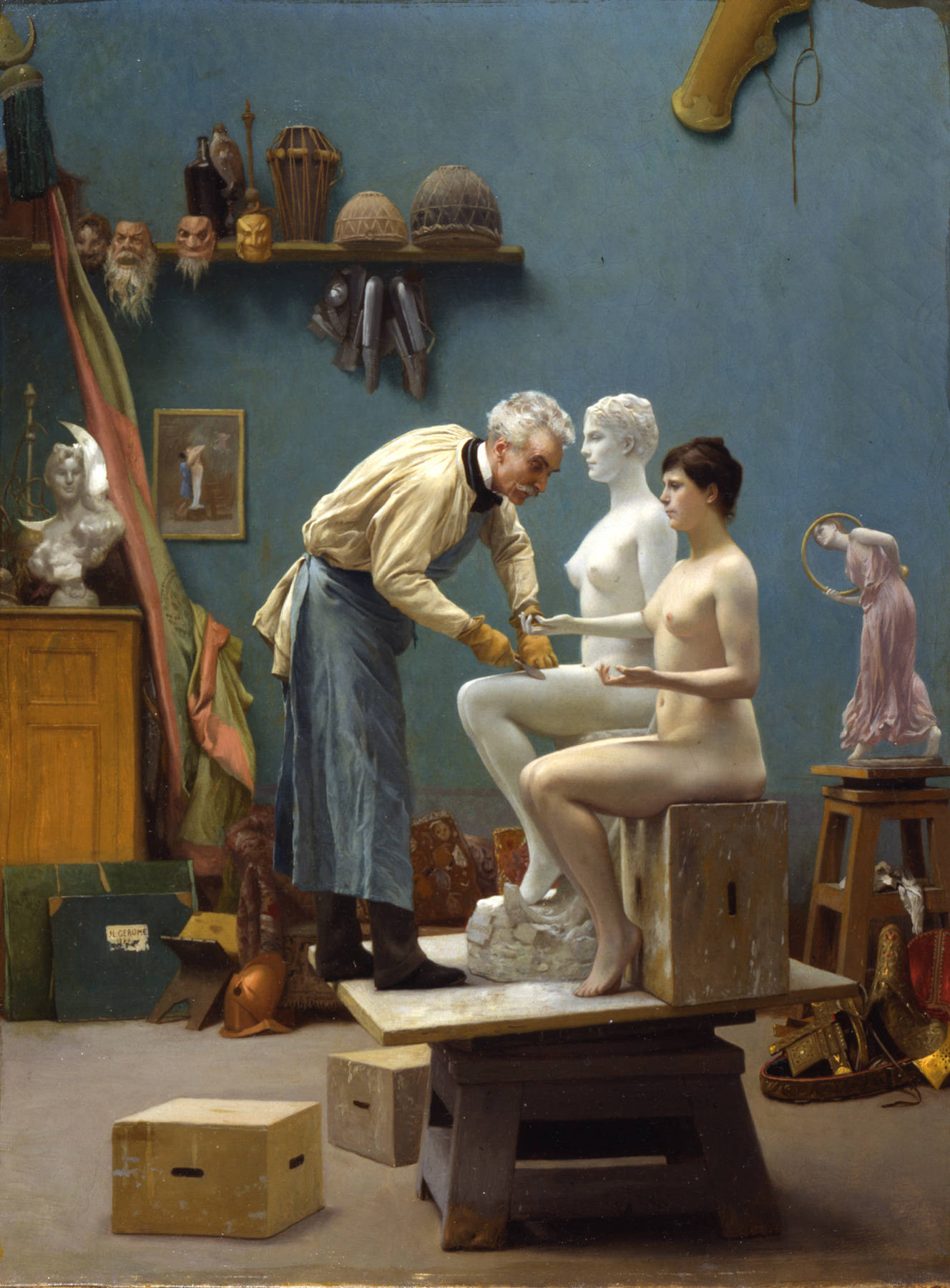
Working in Marble, 1890, Dahesh Museum of Art; Gérôme depicts himself sculpting Tanagra, likely from model Emma Dupont, with Pygmalion and Galatea in the background.

Also in 1890, responding to widespread fascination with the ancient Tanagra figurines recently excavated in Greece, Gérôme sculpted the 5-foot-high, tinted-marble Tanagra, a female nude personifying the Tyche, or presiding spirit, of the ancient city. She holds on her upraised palm a figurine of a female Hoop Dancer (Gérôme's own invention, inspired by, but not a copy of, an actual Tanagra figurine). "Inspired by his characteristic desire for both archaeological accuracy and realism, Gérôme delicately tinted the skin, hair, lips, and nipples of his Tanagra, causing a sensation at the Salon of 1890."

Gérôme subsequently created smaller, gilded bronze versions of Tanagra; several versions of the "Hoop Dancer" figurine held by Tanagra (these became "Gérôme's most popular and widely reproduced sculpture"); two paintings of an imaginary ancient Tanagra workshop where copies of his own Hoop Dancer are on display; and two self-portraits of himself sculpting Tanagra from a living model in his Paris atelier, in which a Hoop Dancer and two different versions of Pygmalion and Galatea can be seen in the background. This complex self-portrait has been called "a summation of Gérôme's remarkable career as both painter and sculptor."

Gérôme also sculpted a tinted-marble Pygmalion and Galatea (1891) based on his paintings.

In this cycle of works, with its exploration of Classical antiquity, creative inspiration, doppelgängers, and female beauty, we see Gérôme "powerfully evoking the continuous interplay between painting and sculpture, reality and artifice, as well as highlighting the inherently theatrical nature of the artist's studio."

== Truth—"This is our Mona Lisa" ==
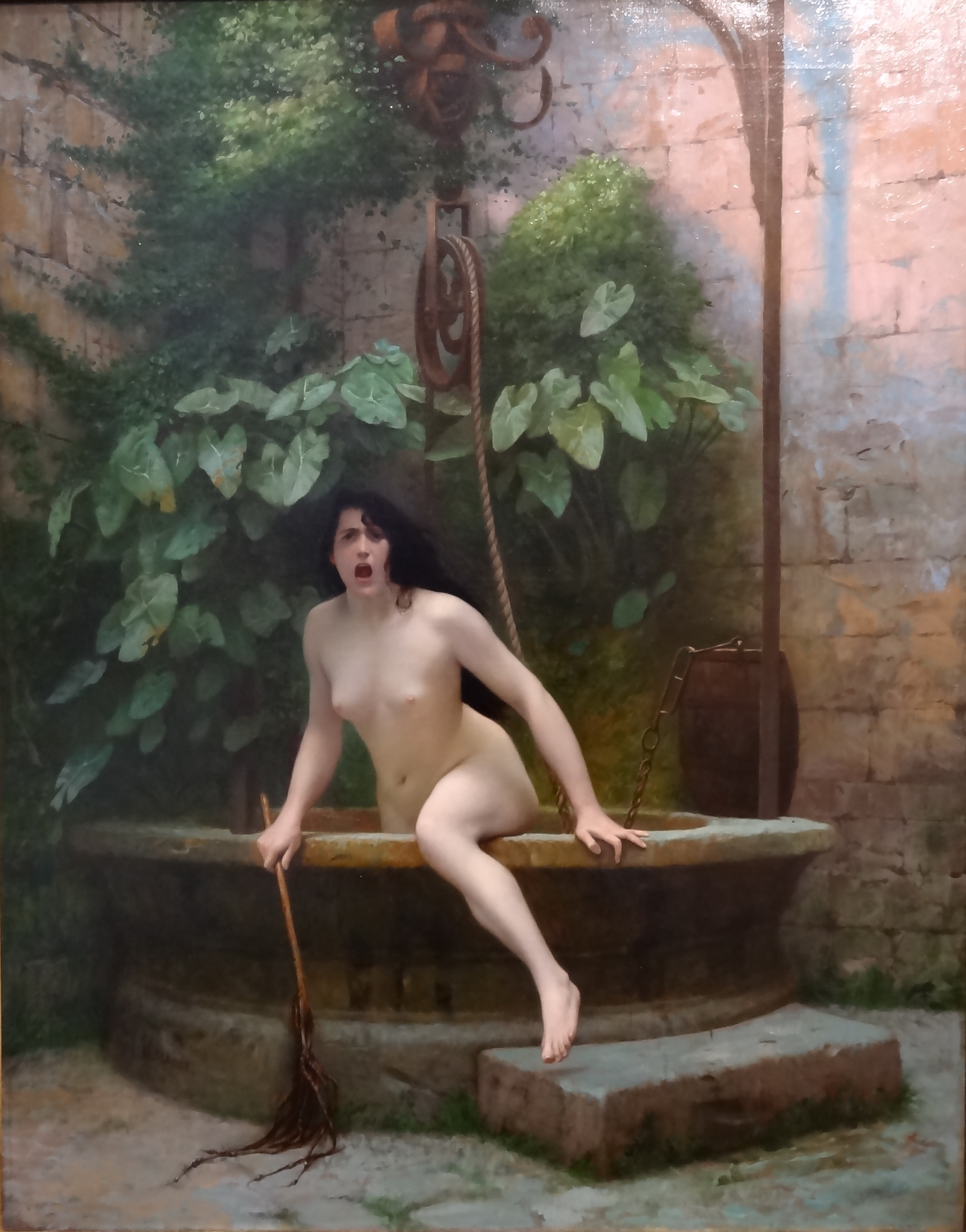
Truth Coming Out of Her Well, 1896, Anne de Beaujeu Museum

Beginning in the mid-1890s, in the last decade of his life, Gérôme made at least four paintings personifying Truth as a nude woman, either thrown into, at the bottom of, or emerging from a well. The imagery was inspired by an aphorism of the philosopher Democritus, "Of truth we know nothing, for truth is in a well."

Truth Coming Out of Her Well, Armed with Her Whip to Chastise Mankind was exhibited in the Salon du Champ de Mars of 1896. It has been assumed that the painting was a comment on the Dreyfus affair, but art historian Bernard Tillier argues that Gérôme's images of Truth and the well were part of his ongoing diatribe against Impressionism.

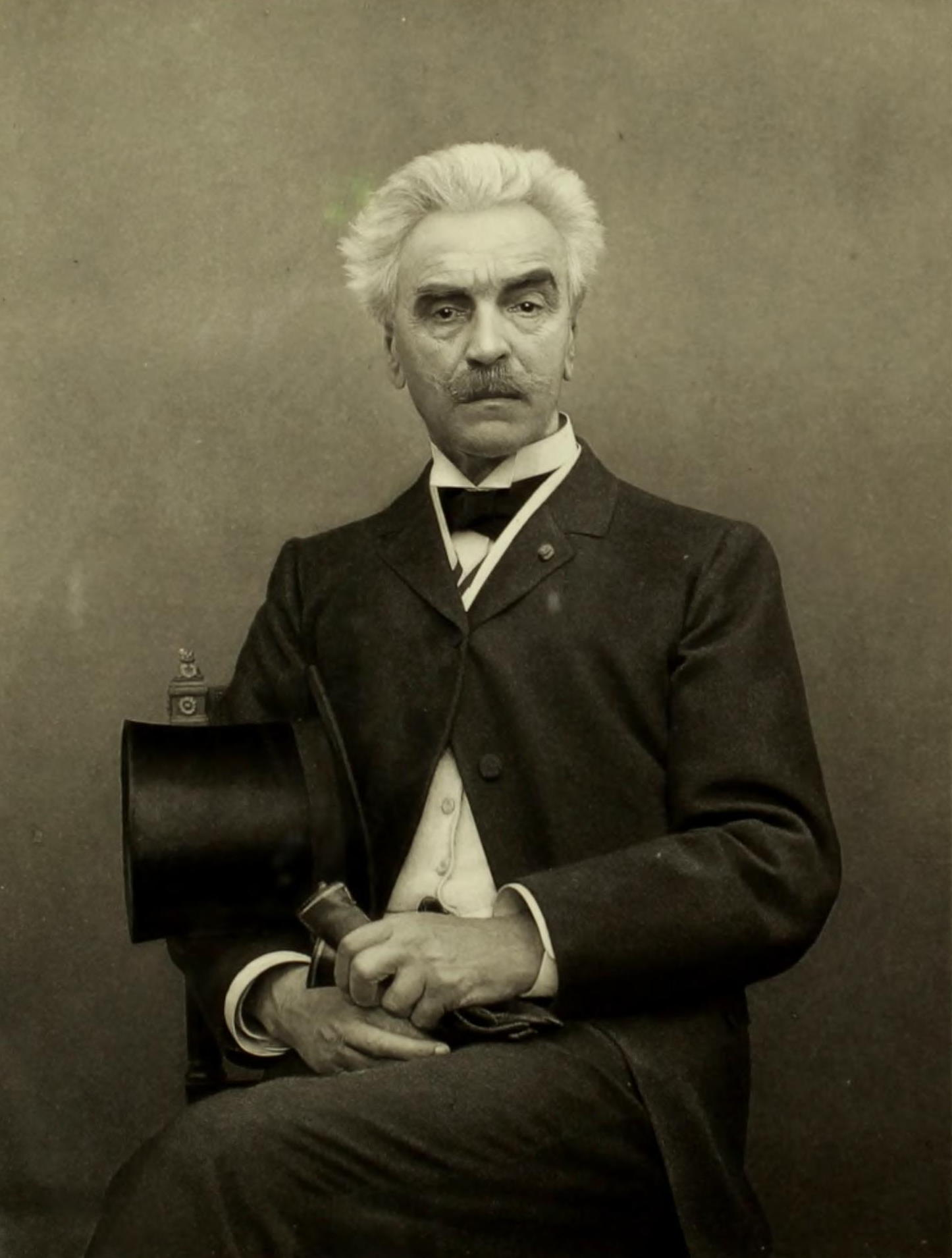
Jean-Léon Gérôme, portrait photogravure Goupil c. 1892

Gérôme himself invoked the metaphor of Truth and the well in a preface he wrote for Émile Bayard's Le Nu Esthétique, published in 1902, to characterize the profound and irreversible influence of photography:

La photographie est un art. La photographie force les artistes à se dépouiller de la vieille routine et à oublier les vieilles formules. Elle nous a ouvert les yeux et forcé à regarder ce qu'auparavant nous n'avions jamais vu, service considérable et inappréciable qu'elle a rendu à l'Art. C'est grâce à elle que la vérité est enfin sortie de son puits. Elle n'y rentrera plus.

Photography is an art. It forces artists to discard their old routine and forget their old formulas. It has opened our eyes and forced us to see that which previously we have not seen; a great and inexpressible service for Art. It is thanks to photography that Truth has finally come out of her well. She will never go back.

In 2012, the Anne de Beaujeu Museum in Moulins, France, which now owns the painting, mounted the exhibition La vérité est au musée ("Truth is at the Museum"), which collected numerous drawings, sketches, and variants made by Gérôme, and by other artists, relating to the painting and its theme. The multiple interpretations of the painting's enigmatic meaning prompted one of the museum's curators to say, "C'est notre Joconde à nous." ("This is our Mona Lisa.")

== Death ==
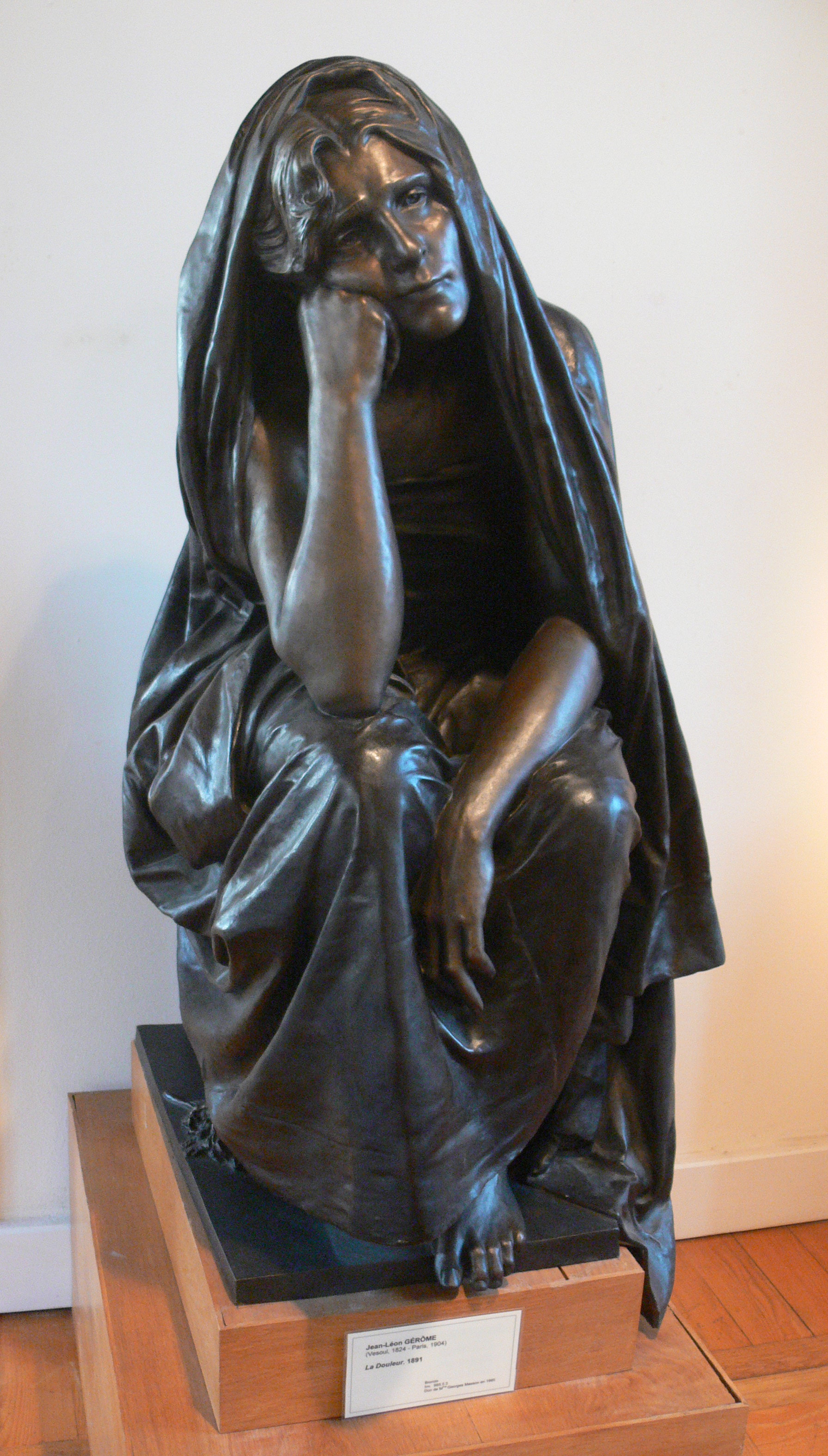
La Douleur, 1891, Musée Georges-Garret, Vesoul

By the end of his life, Gérôme felt very much a man out of his time. In 1903, recalling his first meeting with Charles Jalabert in 1840, he wrote:

At that time, Paris had nothing to do with the Paris of today: no railways, no bicycles, no cars; we were less agitated, and certain districts, among others the one we lived in and which we called the Latin Quarter, had a provincial aspect in their calm and tranquility. Now everything is changed; we no longer walk, we run like crazy; if we are not crushed during the day, we have a good chance of being murdered at night. It is charming. We have witnessed the end of a world, we are witnessing the dawn of a new one, which lacks the picturesque and above all serenity. The day is not far off when, through our customs, our ways of being, our love of the dollar (auri sacra fames), we will no longer be French, neither in spirit nor in heart. Horrible to think of! We will be Americans!

On 31 December 1903, Gérôme wrote to his student and former assistant Albert Aublet, "I begin to have enough of life. I've seen too much misery and misfortune in the lives of others. I still see it every day, and I'm getting eager to escape this theatre." He was to live just ten more days.

On 10 January 1904, "the maid found him dead in the little room next to his atelier, slumped in front of a portrait of Rembrandt and at the foot of his own painting Truth"—but the source for this anecdote, the biographer Moreau-Vauthier, does not specify which painting of Truth. He was 79.

At his own request, he was given a simple burial service without flowers. But the Requiem Mass given in his memory was attended by a former president of the Republic, most prominent politicians, and many painters and writers. He was buried in the Montmartre Cemetery in front of the statue La Douleur (Pain), which he had cast for his son Jean who had died in 1891.

== Legacy ==
Gérôme's legacy lived on through the works of his thousands of students from many countries, including: Odilon Redon, Mary Cassatt, Maxime Faivre, Vasily Vasilyevich Vereshchagin, Stanisław Chlebowski, Ahmed Ali Bey, Henri-Camille Danger and Hosui Yamamoto, and many who traveled to Paris from the United States to study under him, including Thomas Eakins, Edwin Lord Weeks, and Gottardo Piazzoni.

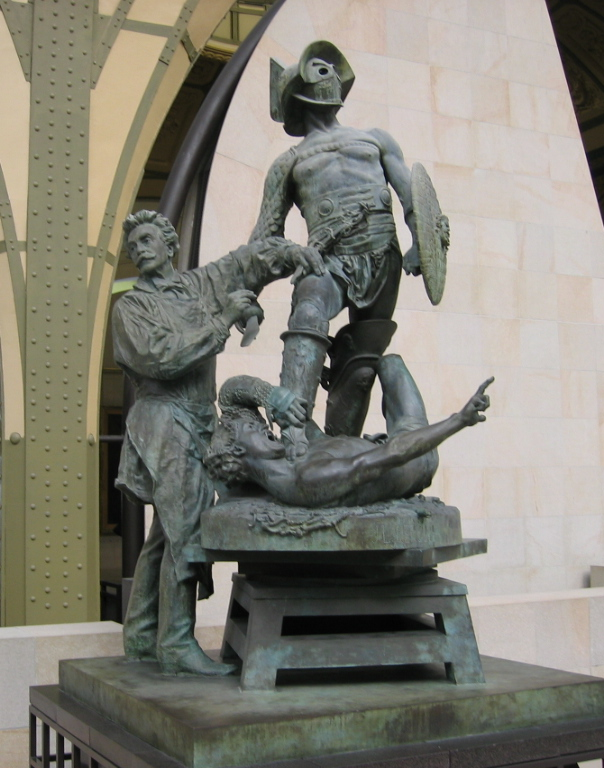
Gérôme Sculpting "The Gladiators": Monument to Gérôme, 1909, by his son-in-law Aimé Morot, at the Musée d'Orsay

Gerald M. Ackerman's revised catalogue raisonné of 2018 lists approximately 700 paintings and 70 sculptures.

In the early 1870s Gérôme was known for an astonishing range of visual exotica, all realized in precise, minute detail, achieved with thin layers of paint that revealed nary a brushstroke...His works were particularly sought after by wealthy Americans...Over the course of his career, Gérôme sold to American patrons 144 paintings, nearly a quarter of his production. [A work by Gérôme in the Nob Hill mansion of Leland Stanford was destroyed in the San Francisco earthquake and fire of 1906.] Despite his prodigious output and enormous transatlantic success, most scholarly articles of recent decades cite Gérôme's work as a noxious blend of the trite, the exploitative and the stultifying academic. However, the latest scholarship is re-evaluating Gérôme and his importance in the nineteenth century. A 2010 essay by art historian Mary G. Morton...points out that, contrary to most twenty- and twenty-first century perspectives...Americans [in the 1800s] found Gérôme's paintings complex, edifying and completely modern.

His detailed depictions of gladiatorial combats, chariot races, slave markets, and various other aspects of the ancient world have left a lasting impression on popular culture.

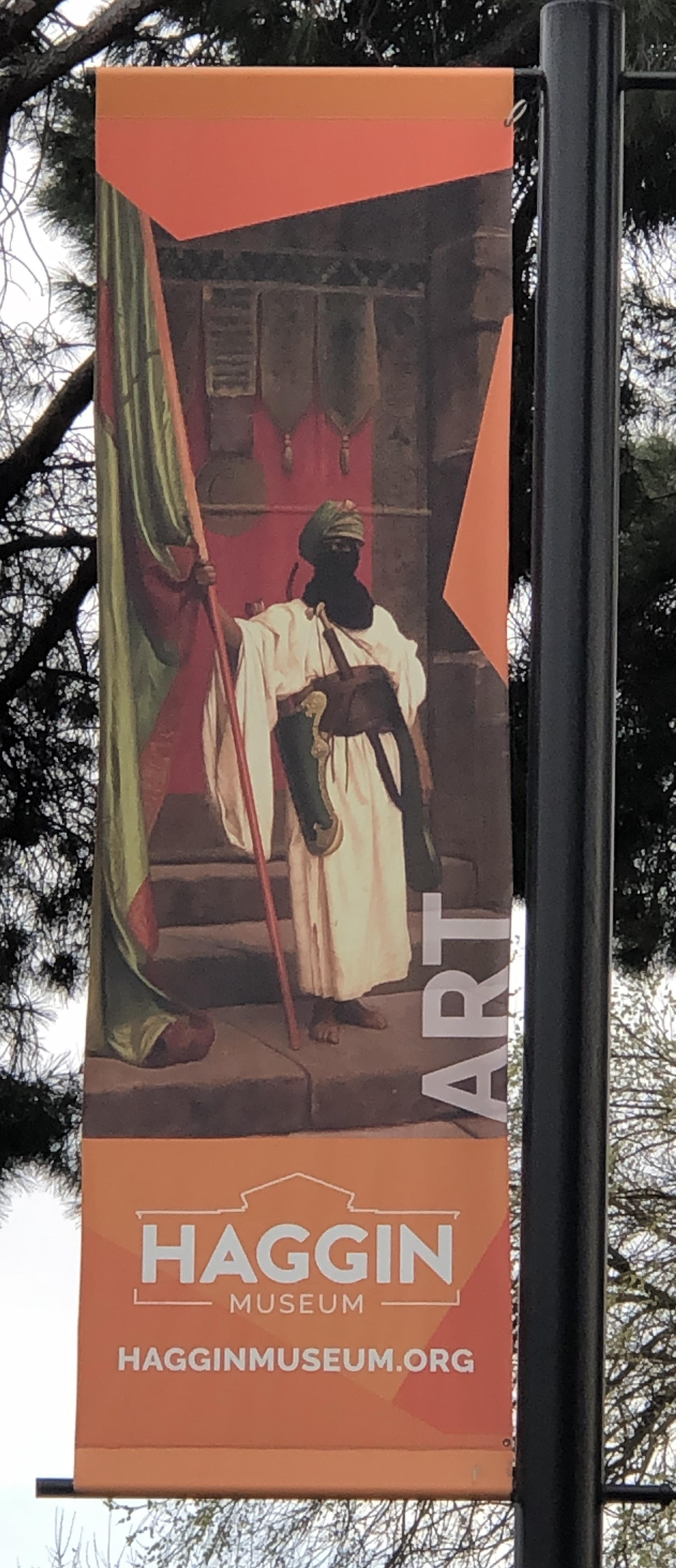
Banner for the Haggin Museum in Stockton, California, using detail from Gérôme's The Standing Bearer, Unfolding the Holy Flag (1876)

His ethnographic imagery of Arab and Islamic culture, controversial in his own lifetime, is now even more closely scrutinized, as is his penchant for female nudity; modern critics raise issues of "cultural appropriation" and "sexual exploitation". These issues of sex and race were epitomized by the use in 2019 of his painting The Slave Market in an anti-Muslim campaign poster by the right wing populist party, Alternative for Germany, to the consternation of the American museum that owns the painting.

Despite charges that the Orientalizing paintings of Gérôme (and others) exploited and indulged in stereotypes of Arab and Muslim cultures, there is now "a high level of interest in collecting Gérôme's art in the Middle East," as evinced by high prices paid at auction for his work by the Qatar Museums Authority in Doha. "They want to take it back and have it for themselves," says art historian Emily M. Weeks. Egyptian industrialist and art collector Shafik Gabr sees Gérôme and other Orientalist painters as "intrepid early globalists who put themselves at risk to document a new world opened by Napoleon Bonaparte's Egyptian expedition from 1798 to 1801...'I have been inspired by these painters...These people traveled under very difficult circumstances with no knowledge of what to expect. They didn't travel to conquer or find oil. They traveled to discover and to understand.'"

Gérôme's highly vocal opposition to Impressionism was a losing argument, and his work was relegated to the margins of art history by critics, historians, and museum professionals who believed that

his chosen themes corrupted the loftier purposes of art, thus leading to commercialism...they also objected to his orientalism, which they disparaged for being untrue, a perversion or concoction of the true Orient....Now, with the exhibition at the Getty Museum, and a larger version of the show opening at the Musée d'Orsay in October 2010, Gérôme is finally receiving the attention he deserves. No longer will he be lost in time, although his paintings, the way he developed them, and his relationship with many of the major issues of artistic creativity in the nineteenth century and beyond will remain controversial.

As with other painters of Classical Realism and Academic art of the 19th century, Gérôme's prestige and popularity sharply declined in the 20th century; his painting The Snake Charmer, which sold for $19,500 in 1888, sold for $500 in 1942. Now his works are once again sought after in the international art market. In 2008, his painting Femme circassienne voilée or Veiled Circassian Beauty (1876) was auctioned for 2,057,250 GBP; it now belongs to the Qatar Museums Authority in Doha. In 2019, his painting The Harem in the Kiosk (c. 1870–1875) realized 2,655,000 GBP at auction, and his painting Riders Crossing the Desert (1870) realized 3,135,000 GBP.

The most wide-ranging single collection of Gérôme's work may be the several rooms dedicated to displaying his paintings and sculptures at the Musée Georges-Garret in the artist's hometown of Vesoul. Gérôme donated several works to the museum during his lifetime, and his heirs donated more works after his death.

In August 2022 the painting known as Arab at Prayer was investigated in the BBC series Fake or Fortune?. Dated 1858 and with Gérôme's signature, the work was downgraded to 'Circle of Gérôme' in the 1980s by leading authority Gerald M. Ackerman. Following Ackerman's death in 2016, the painting's owner approached the programme to look into the possibility of re-attribution. After extensive research and technical analysis, the evidence is presented to a new expert, Emily M. Weeks, who finds that the picture was painted by Gérôme. In October 2021, the painting sold for £94,500 (including fees) at a Sotheby's auction in London.

== Gallery (chronological) ==
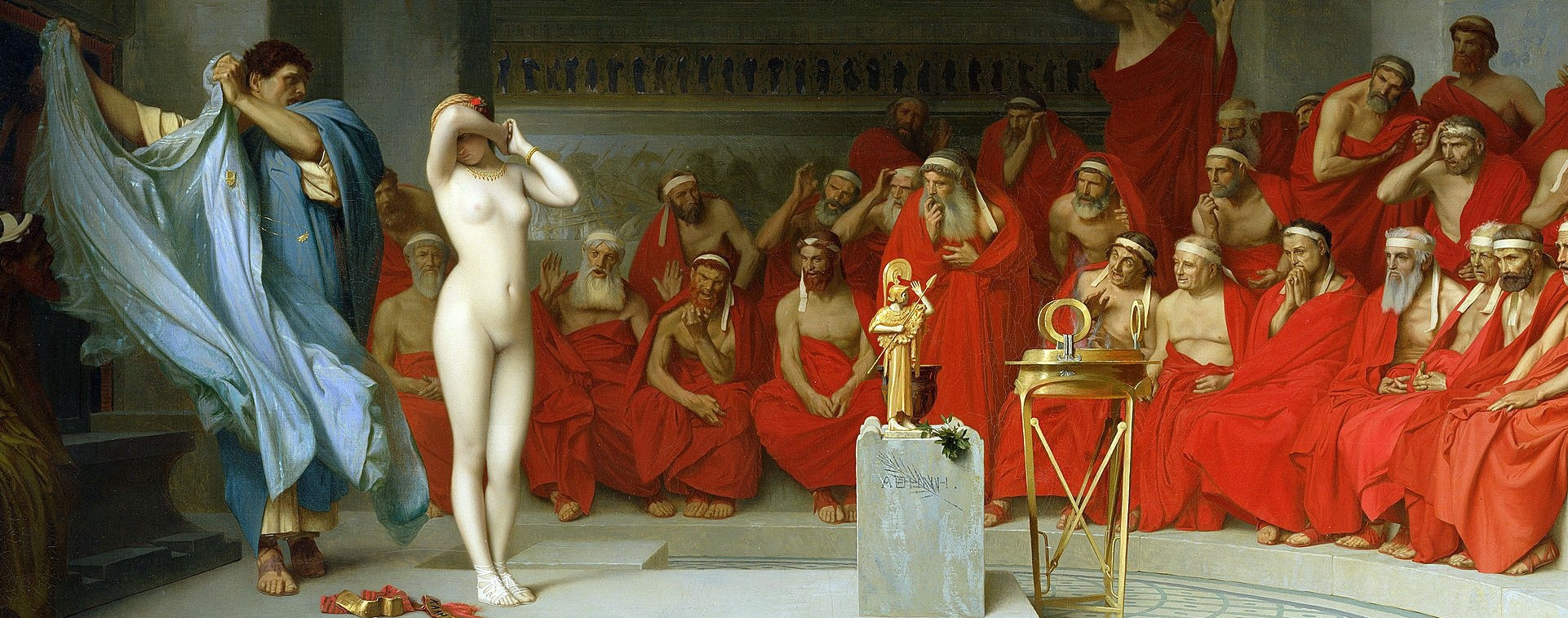
Phryne Before the Areopagus (detail), 1861, Kunsthalle Hamburg
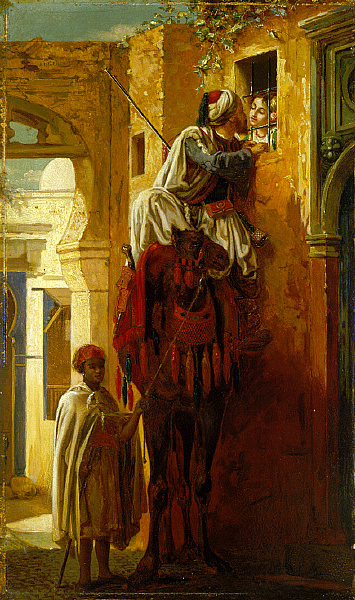
The Tryst (exterior), after 1840, Saint Louis Art Museum

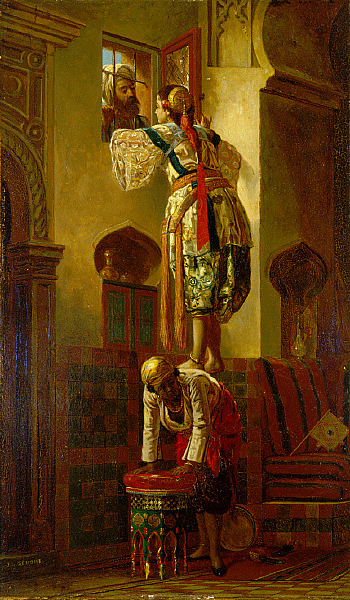
The Tryst (interior), after 1840, Saint Louis Art Museum

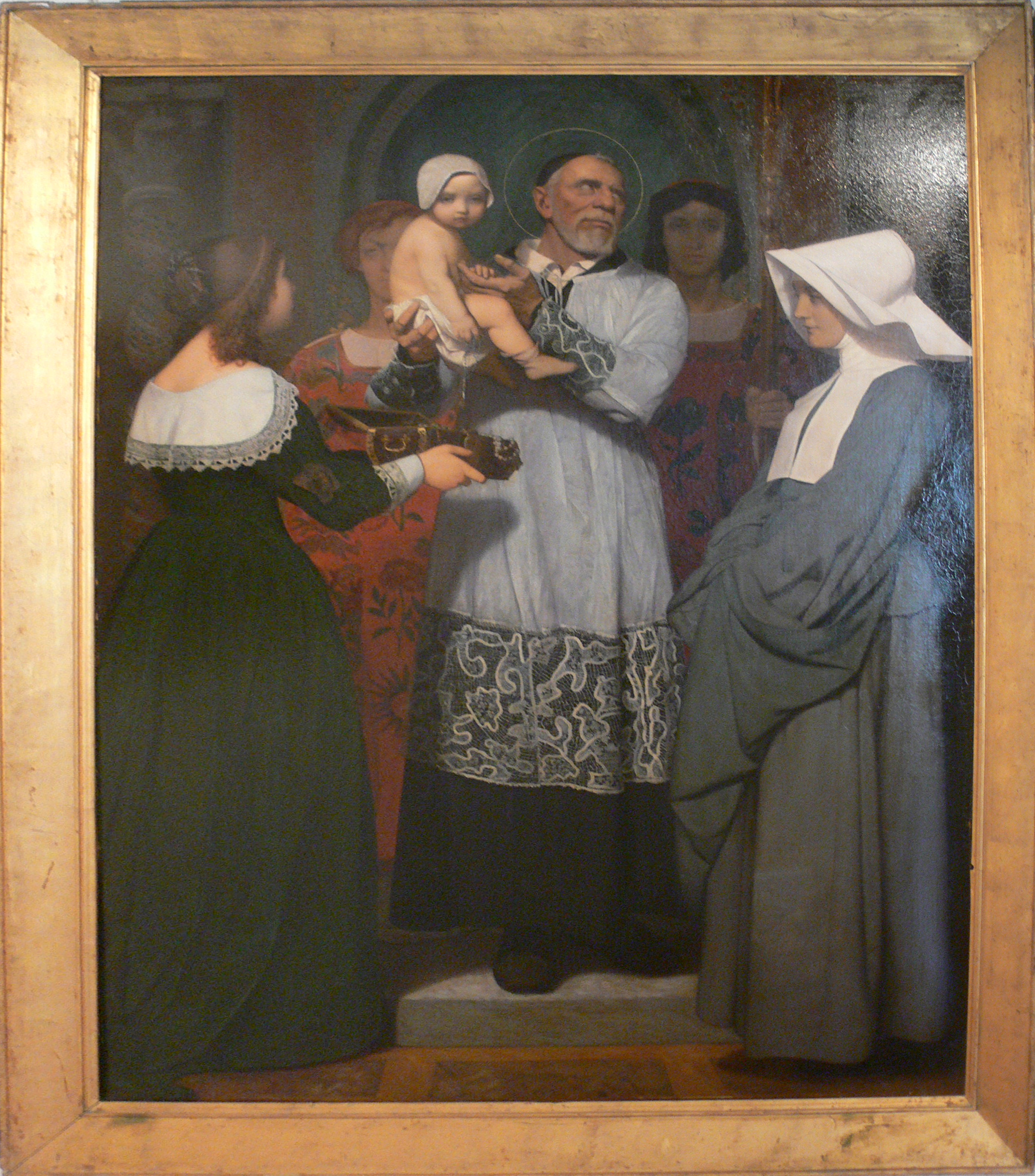
Saint Vincent de Paul, 1847, Musée Georges-Garret, Vesoul

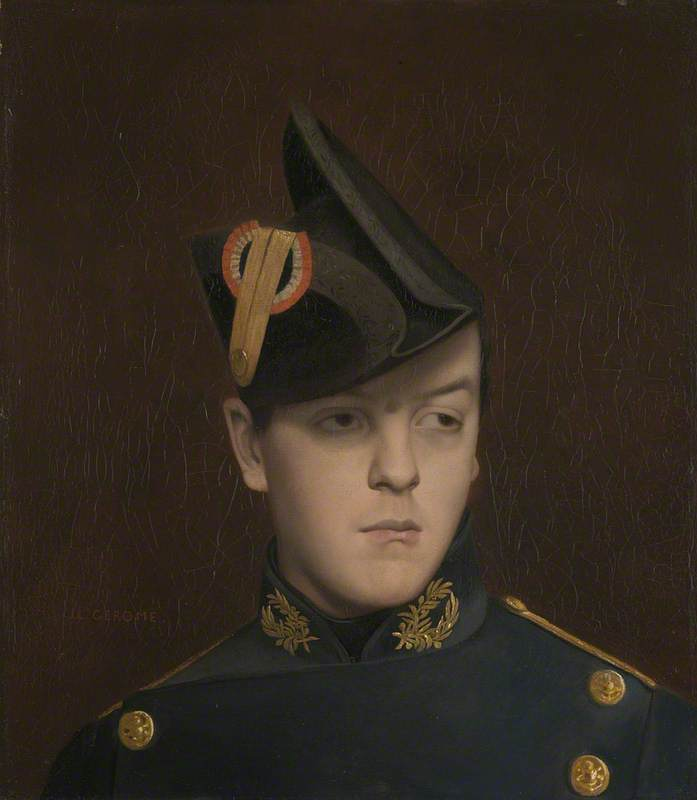
Portrait of Claude-Armand Gérôme (brother of the artist), 1848, The National Gallery, London

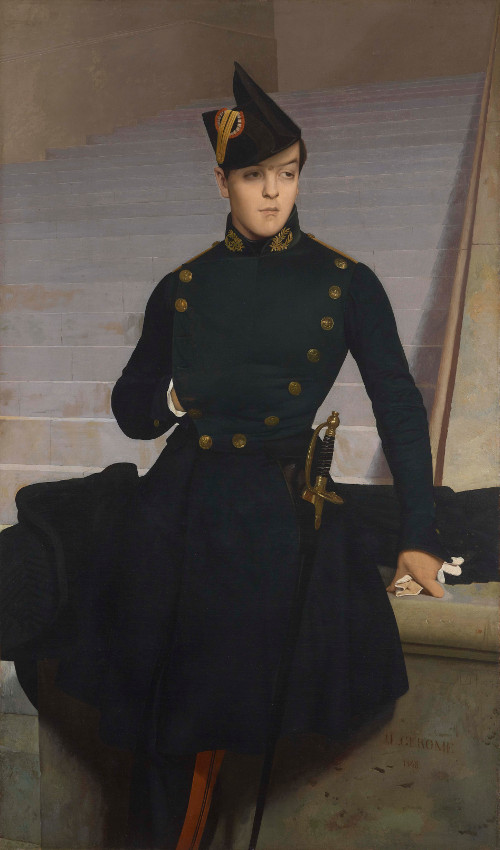
Portrait of Claude-Armand Gérôme c.1848, Fitzwilliam Museum

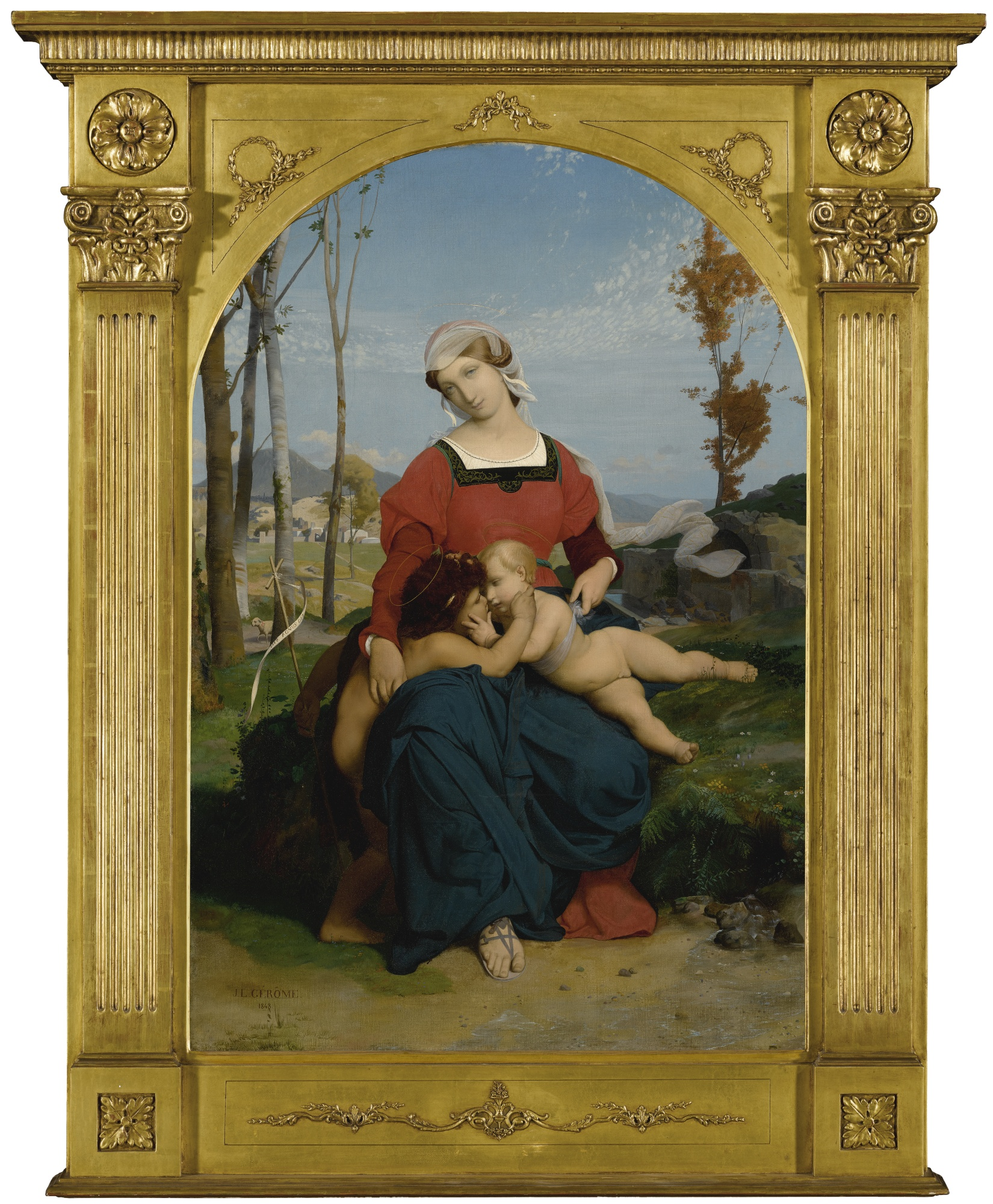
The Virgin, the Infant Jesus and Saint John, 1848, private collection

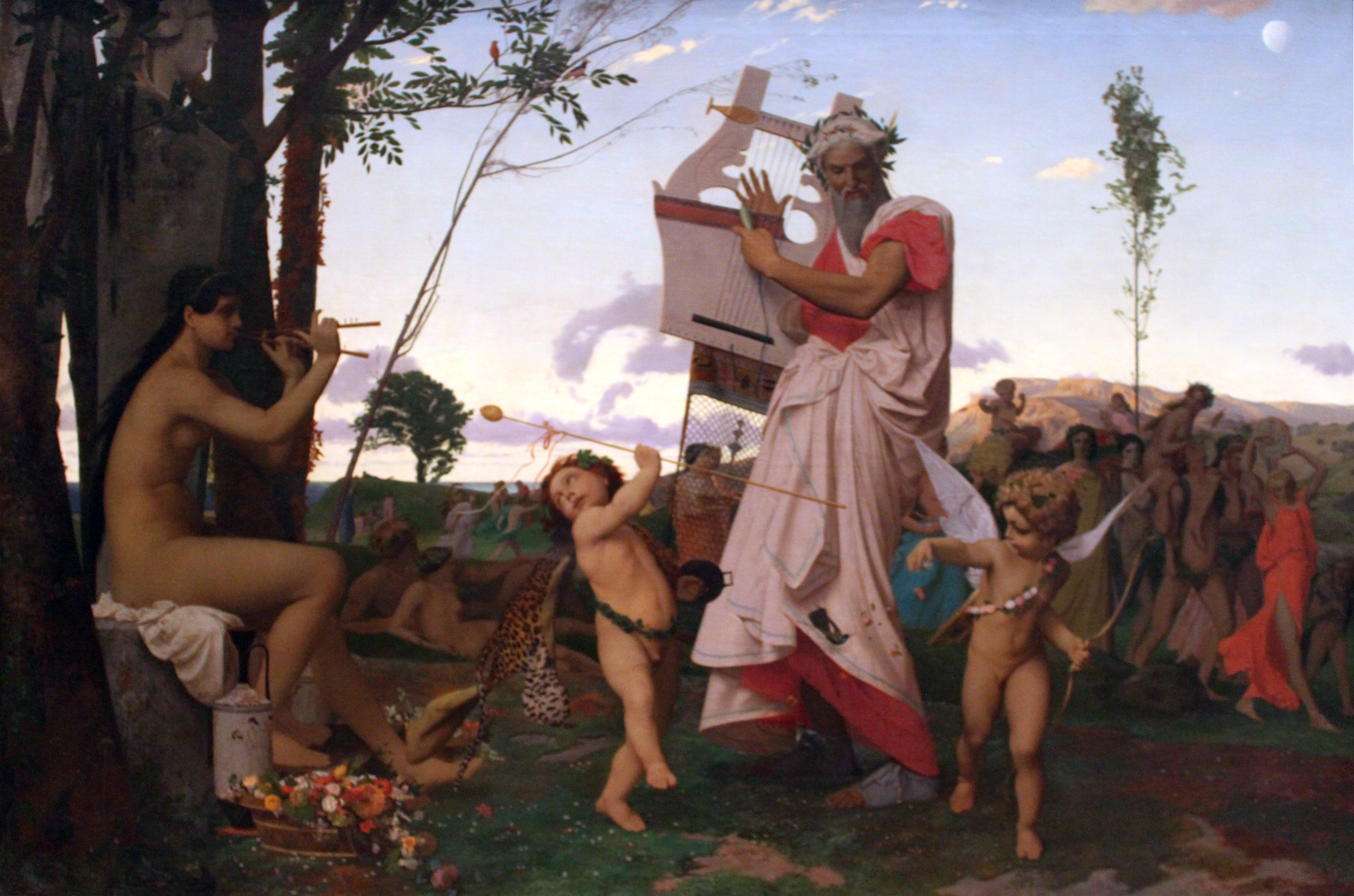
Anacreon, Bacchus, and Eros, 1848, Musée des Augustins

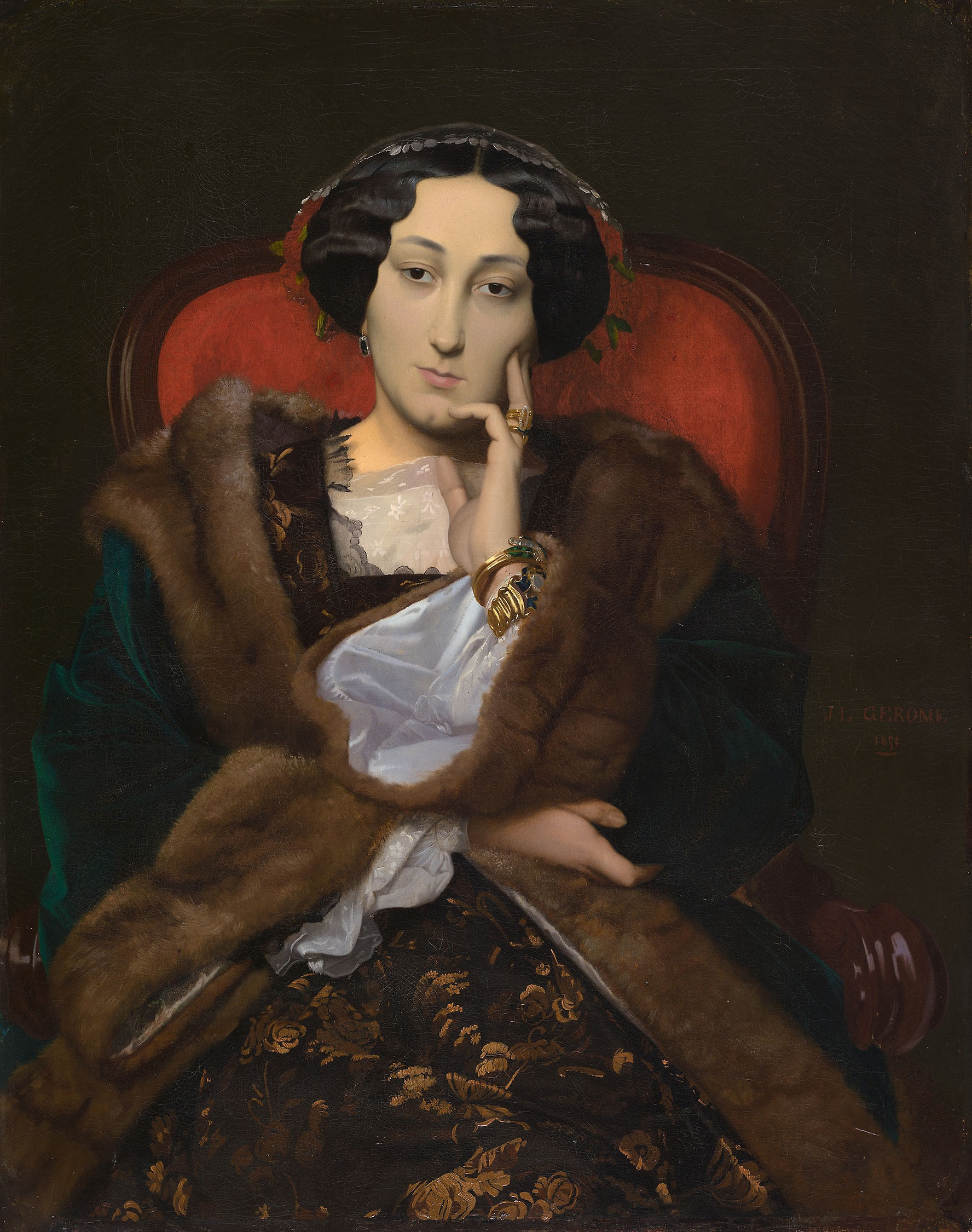
Portrait of a Woman, 1848, Art Institute of Chicago

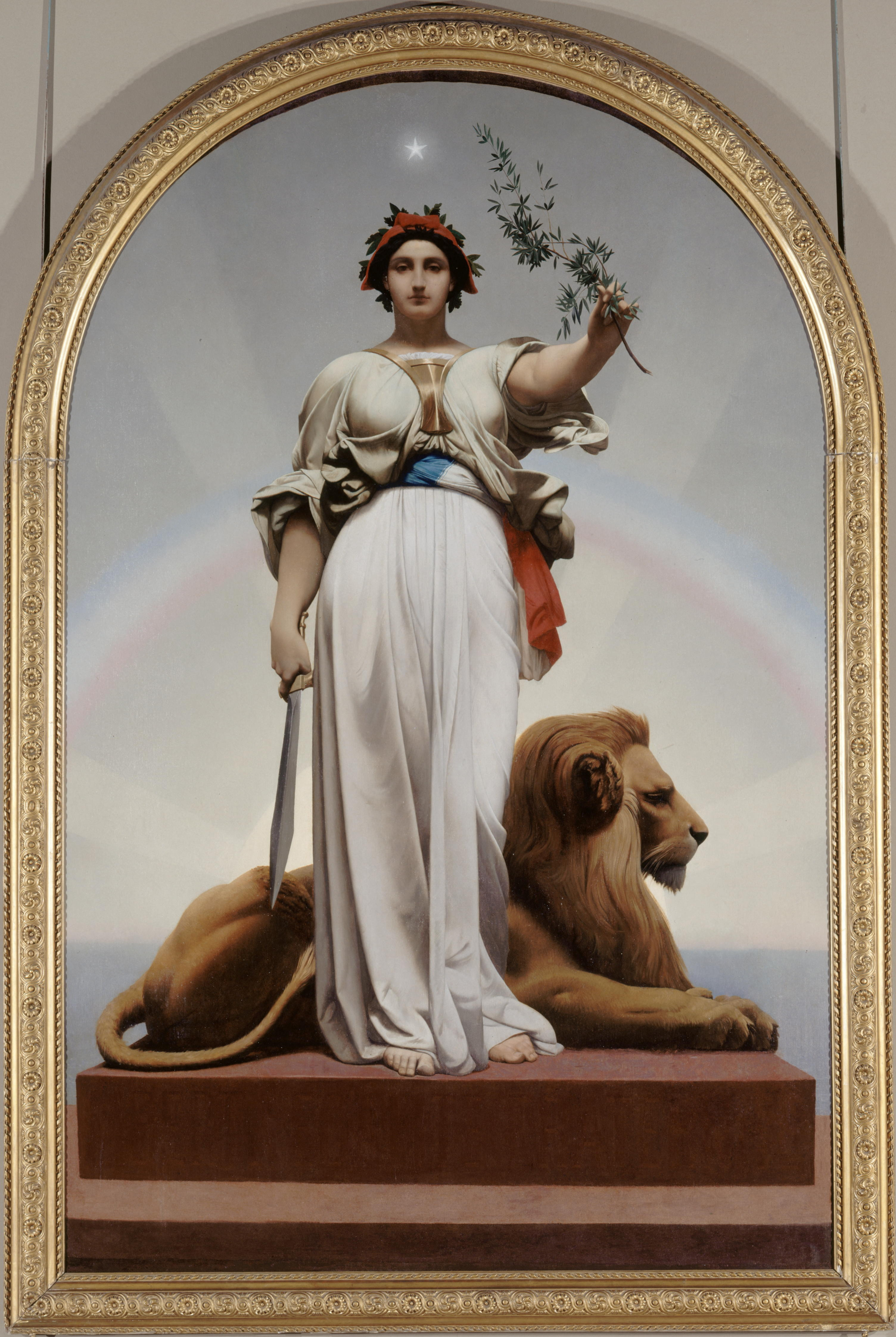
La République, 1848–1849, Petit Palais, Paris

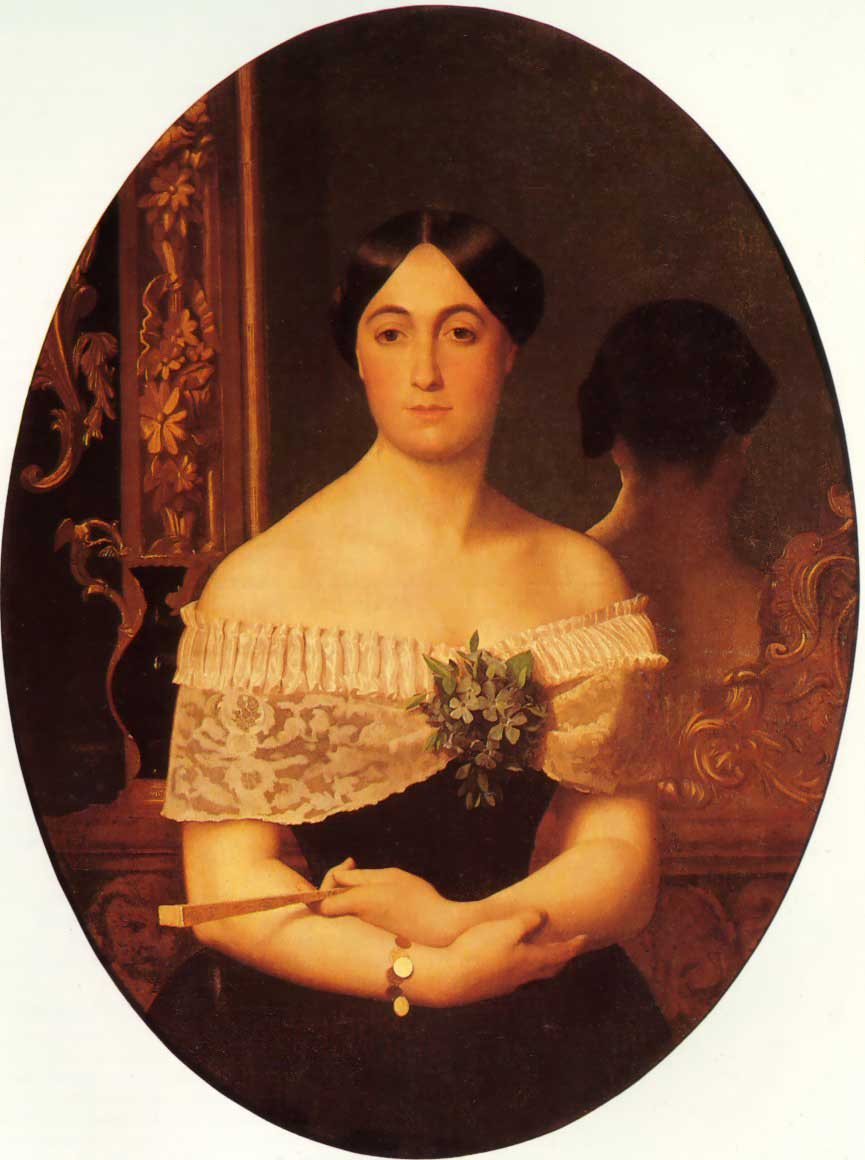
Portrait of a Lady, 1849, Musée Ingres

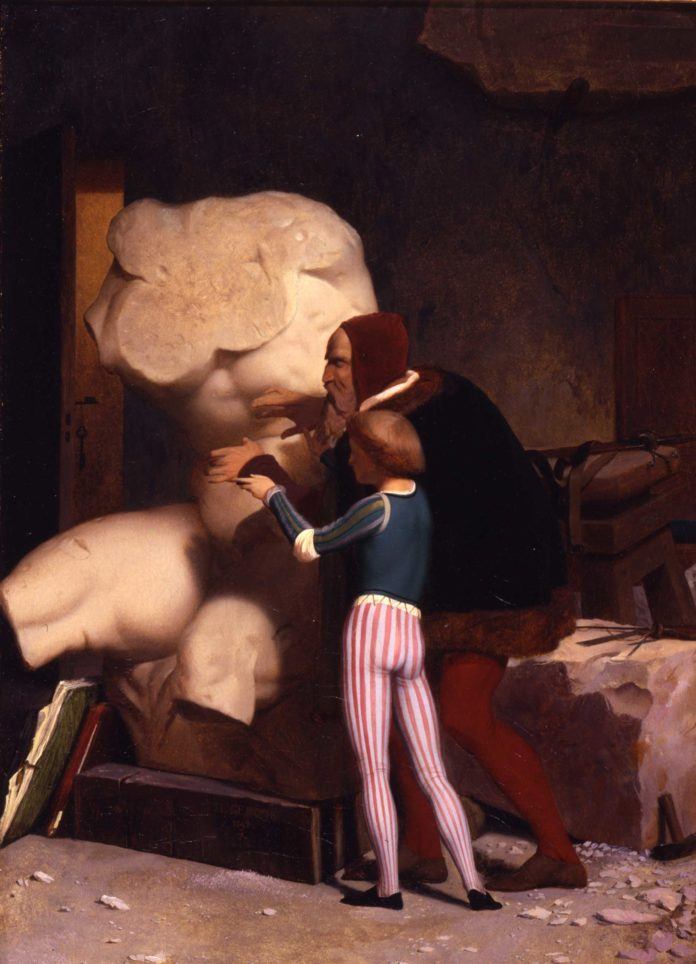
Michelangelo Being Shown the Belvedere Torso, 1849, Dahesh Museum of Art

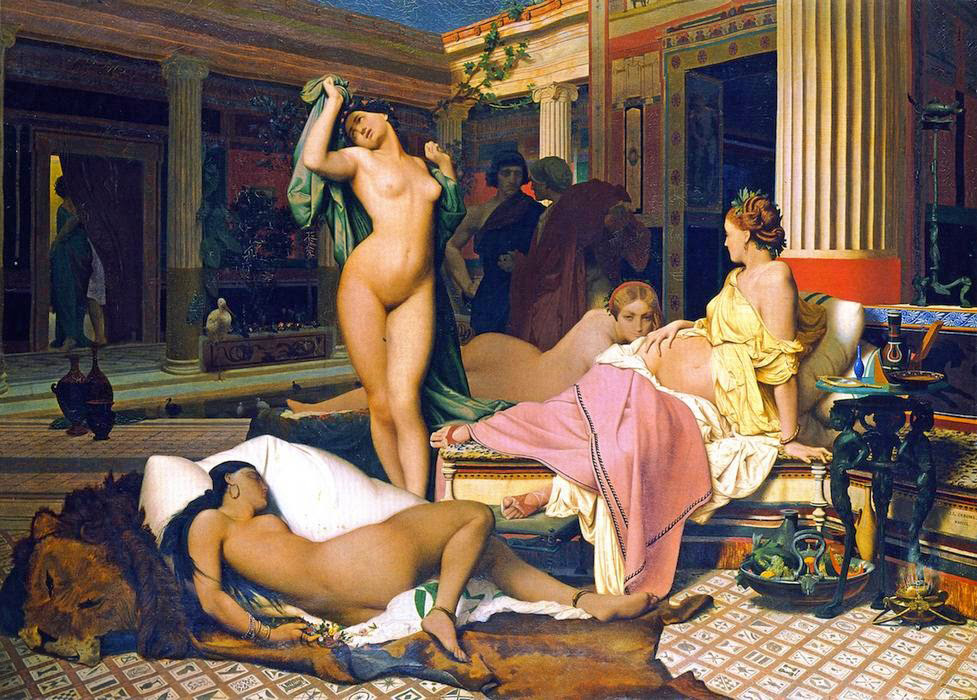
Gynaeceum or ancient Greek Interior, 1850

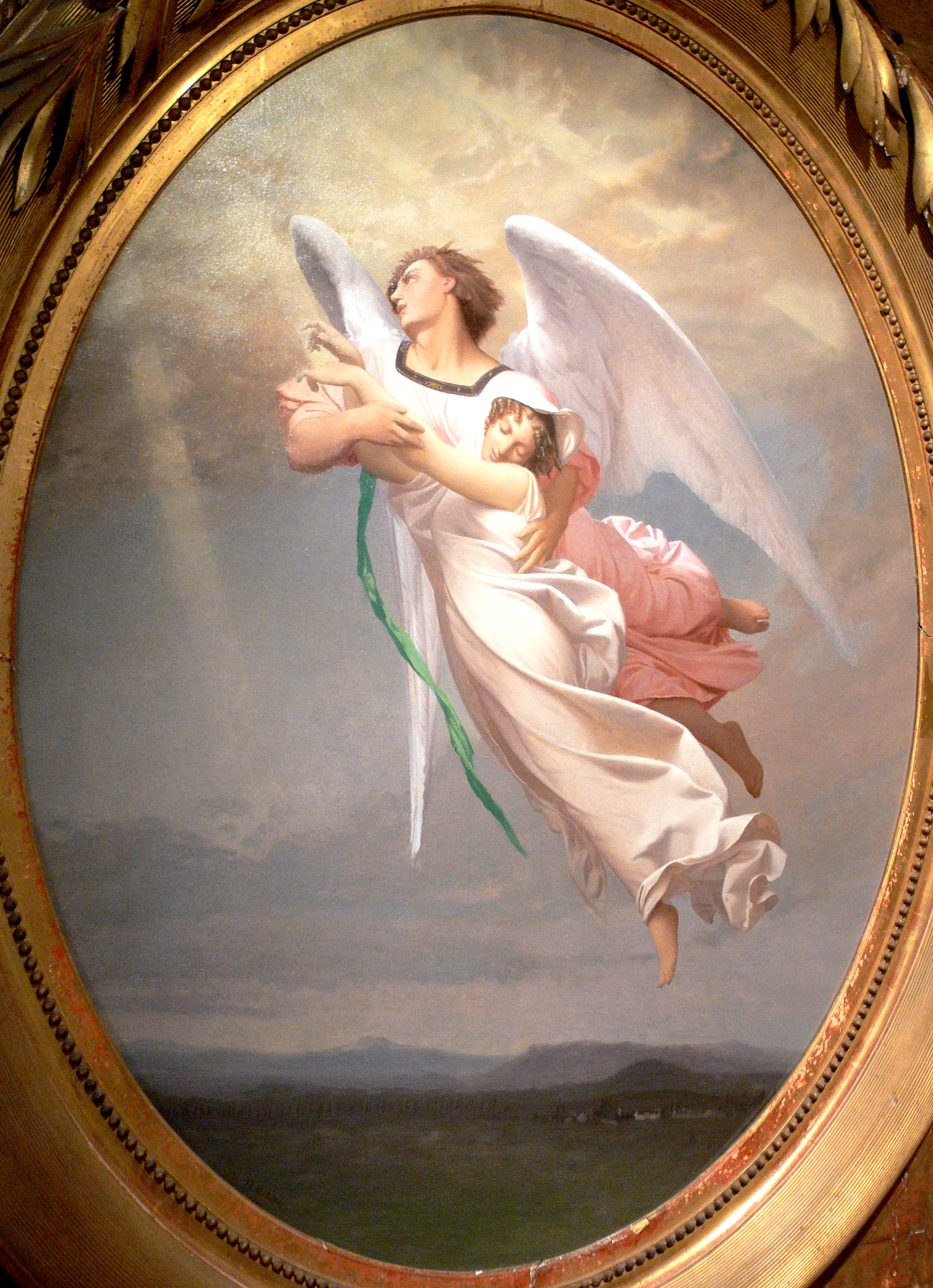
A Soul Carried Away by an Angel, 1853, Musée Georges-Garret, Vesoul

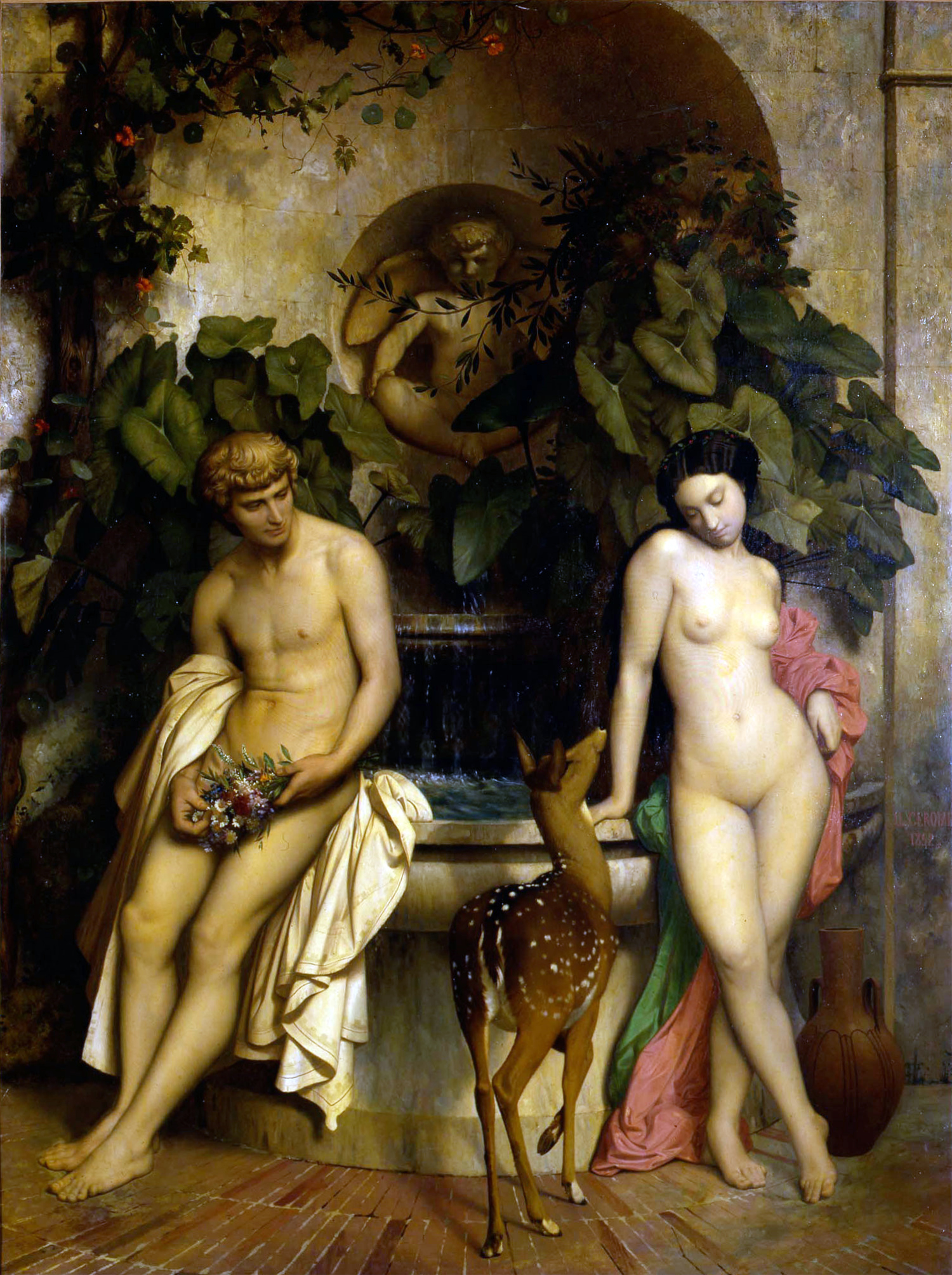
The Idyll, 1852, Musée Massey

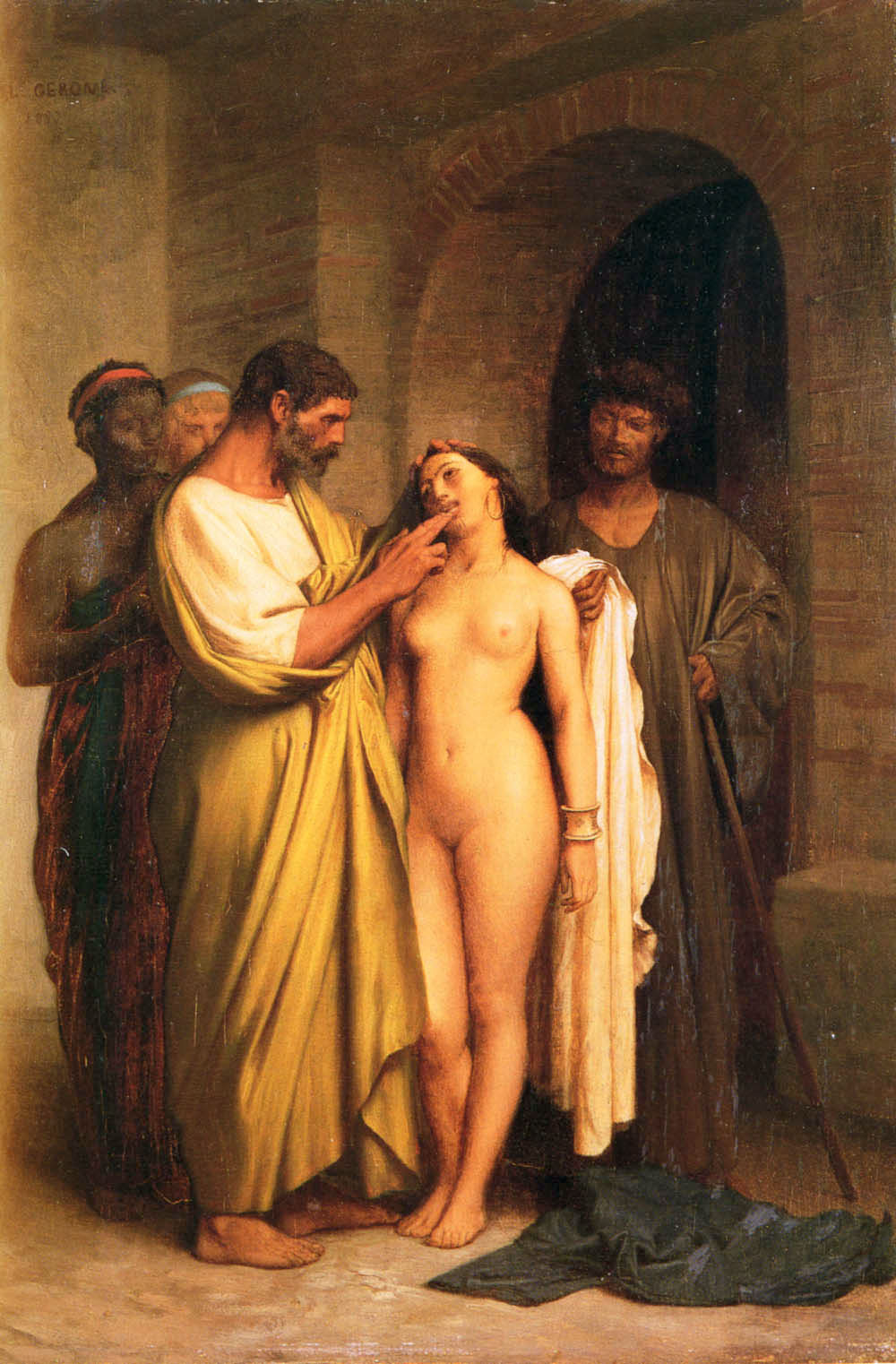
Buying a Slave, 1857; provenance discussed by Sarah Lees

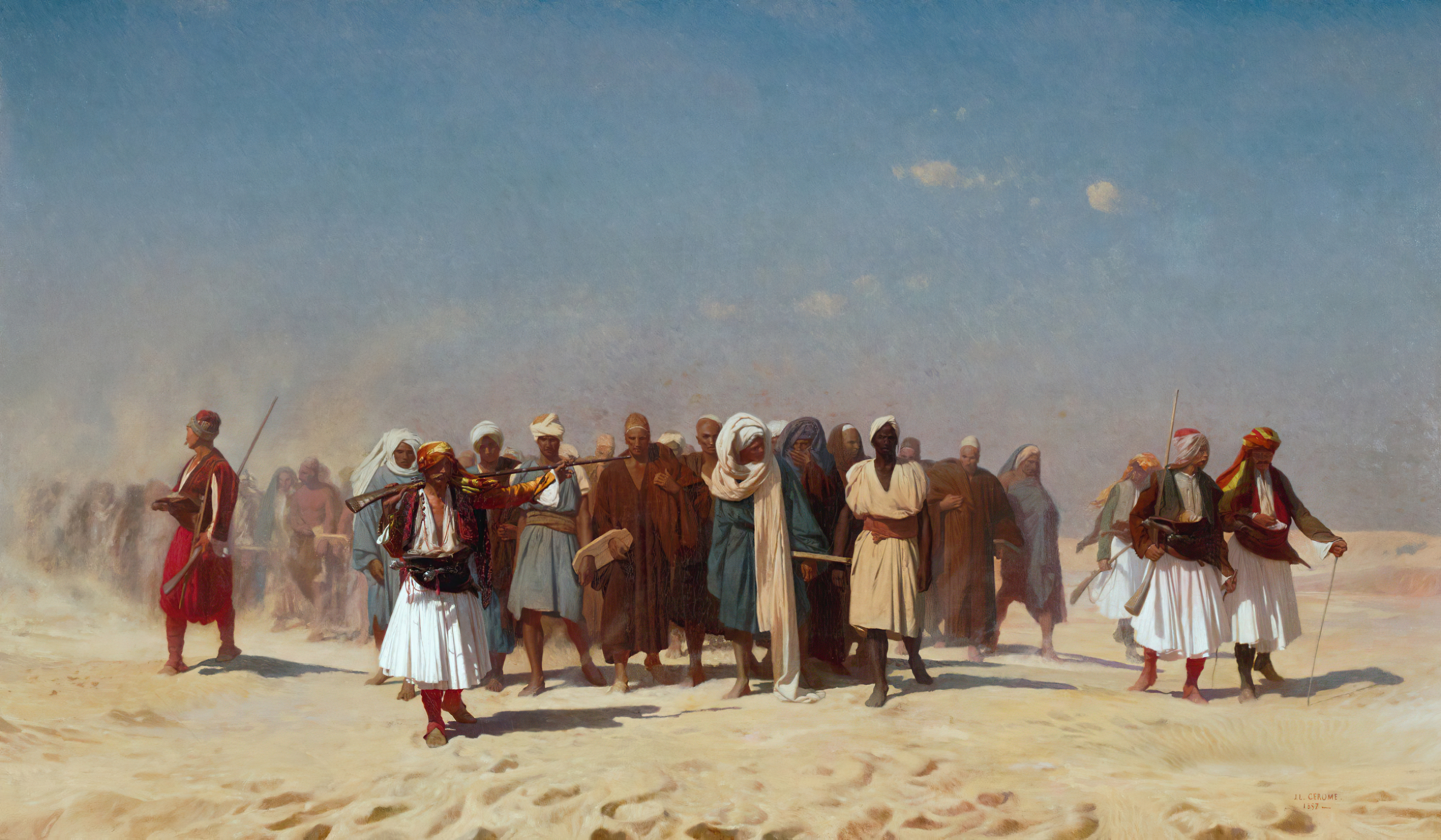
Egyptian Recruits Crossing the Desert, 1857

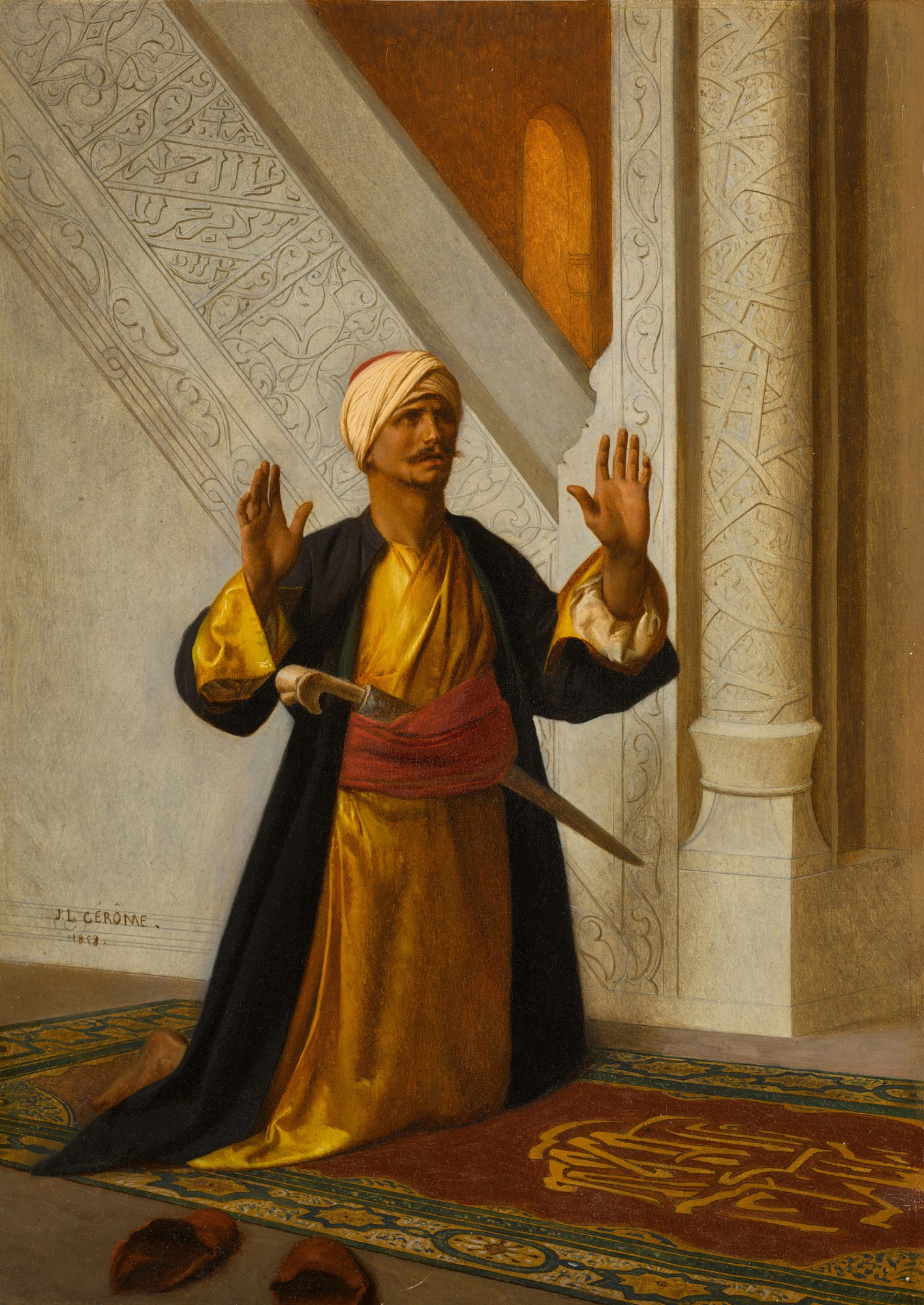
At Prayer,1858

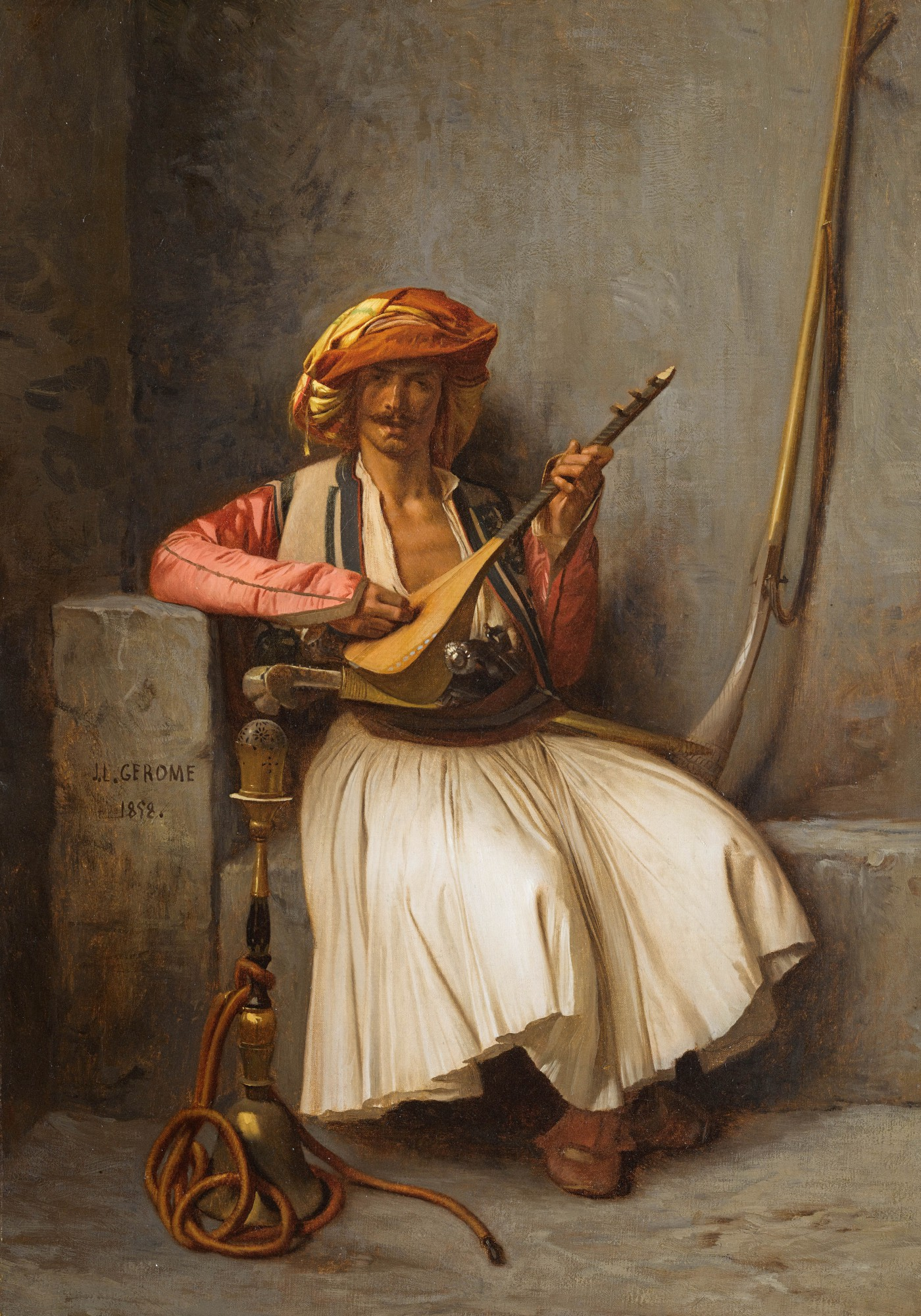
The Lute Player, 1858.

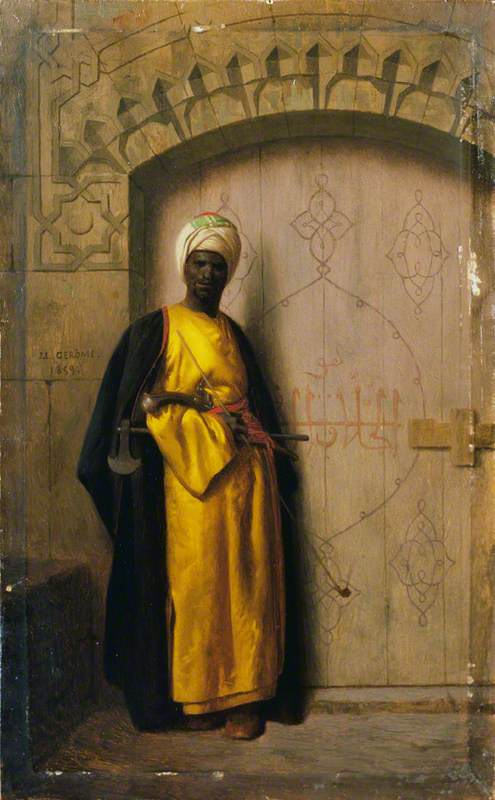
The Guard of the Harem, Wallace Collection, London, 1859

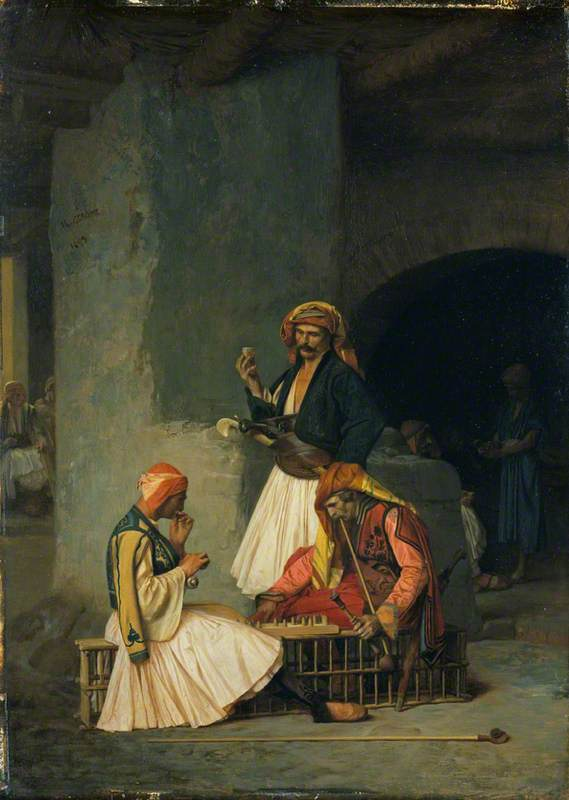
The Draught Players, Wallace Collection, London, 1859

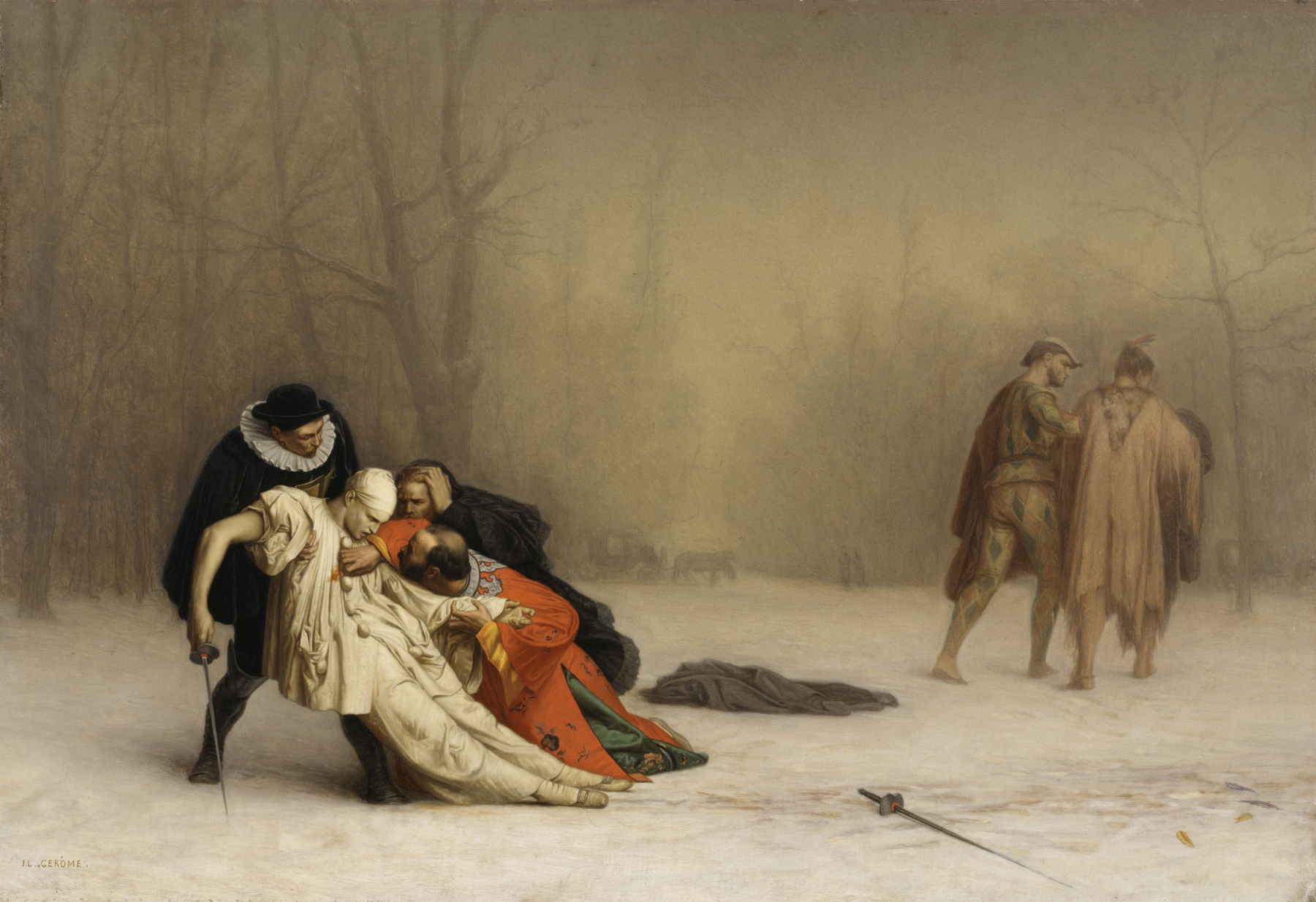
The Duel After the Masquerade, version of 1859, Walters Art Museum

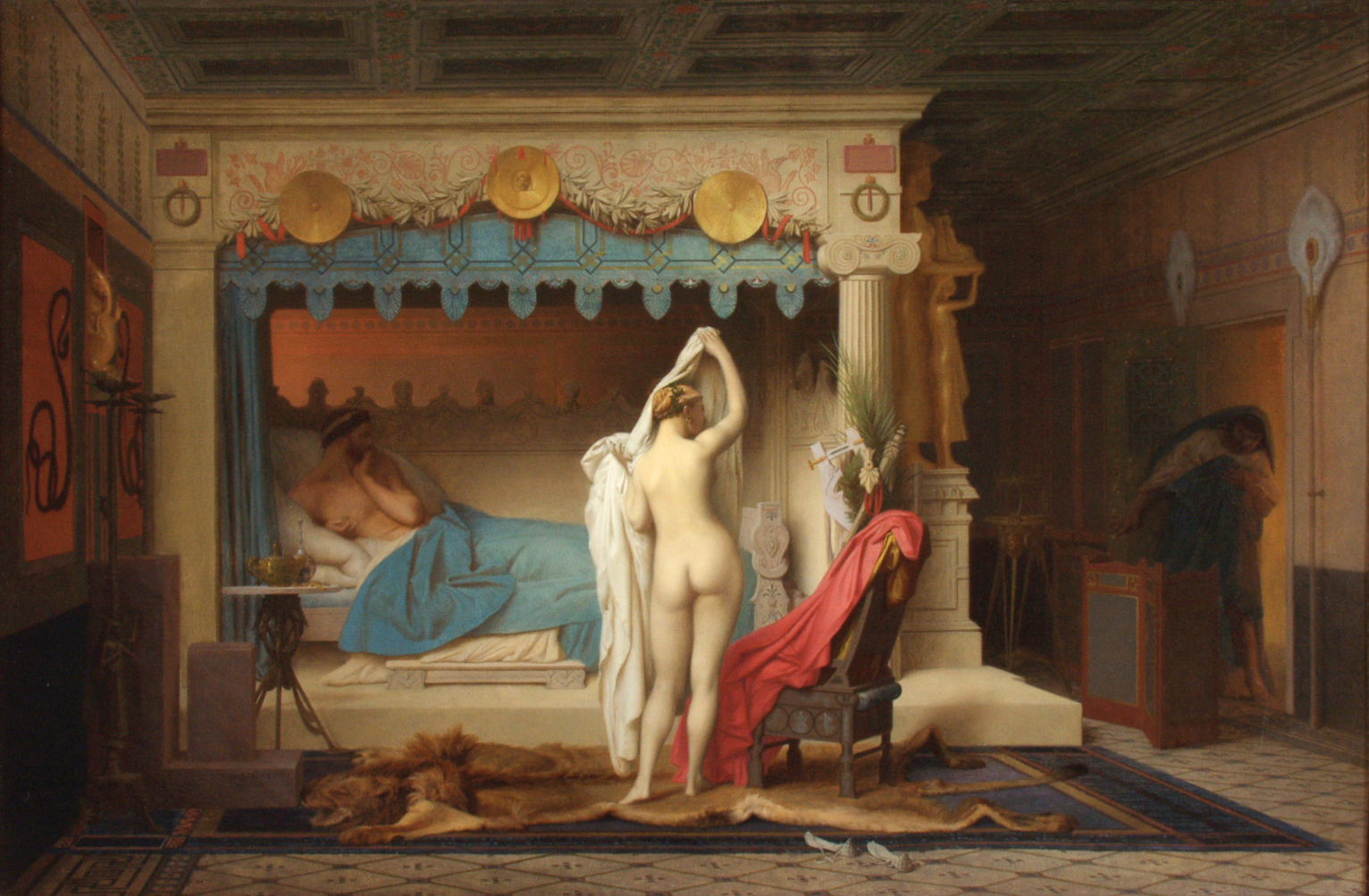
King Candaules, 1859, Museo de Arte de Ponce

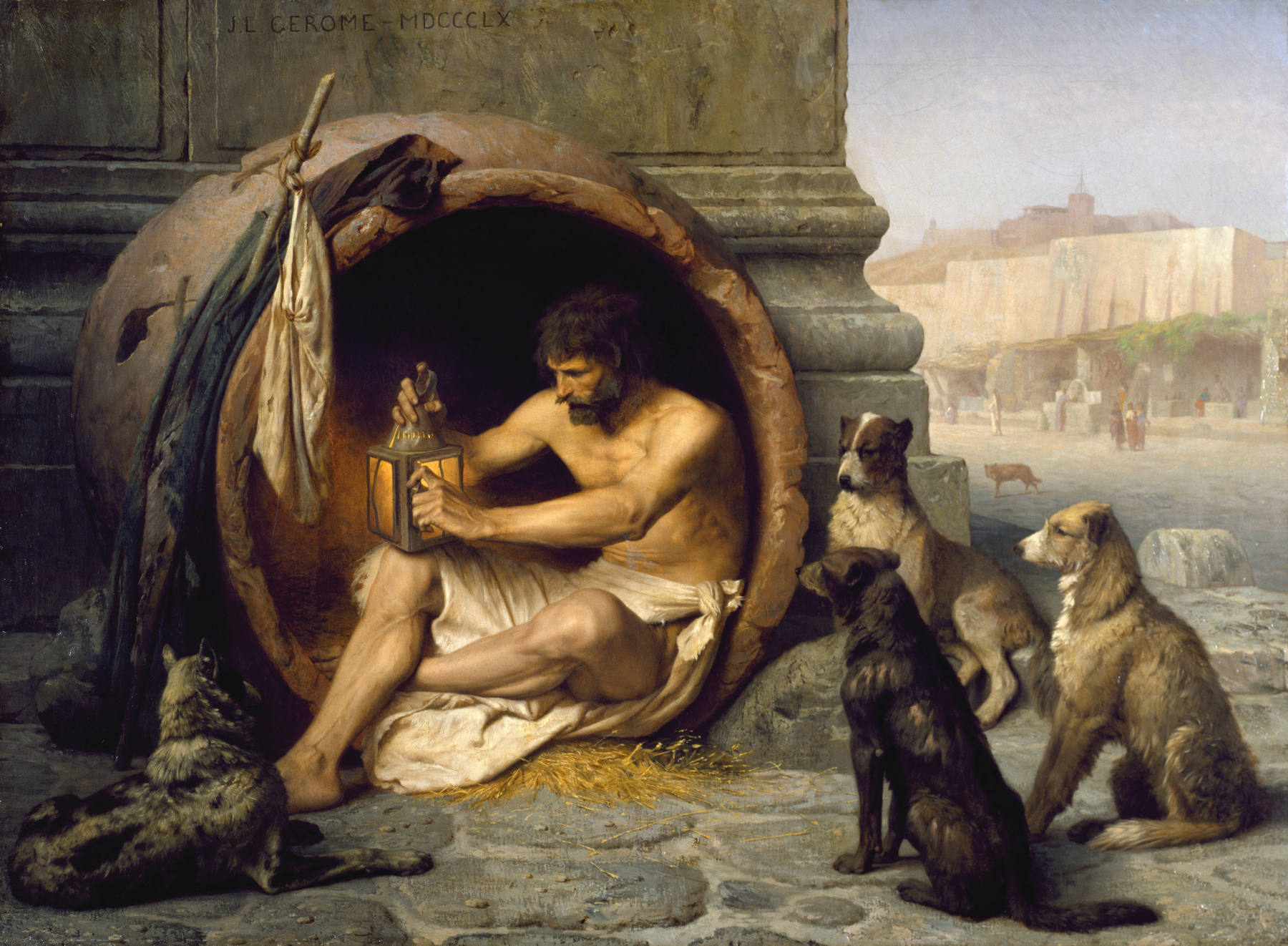
Diogenes, 1860, Walters Art Museum

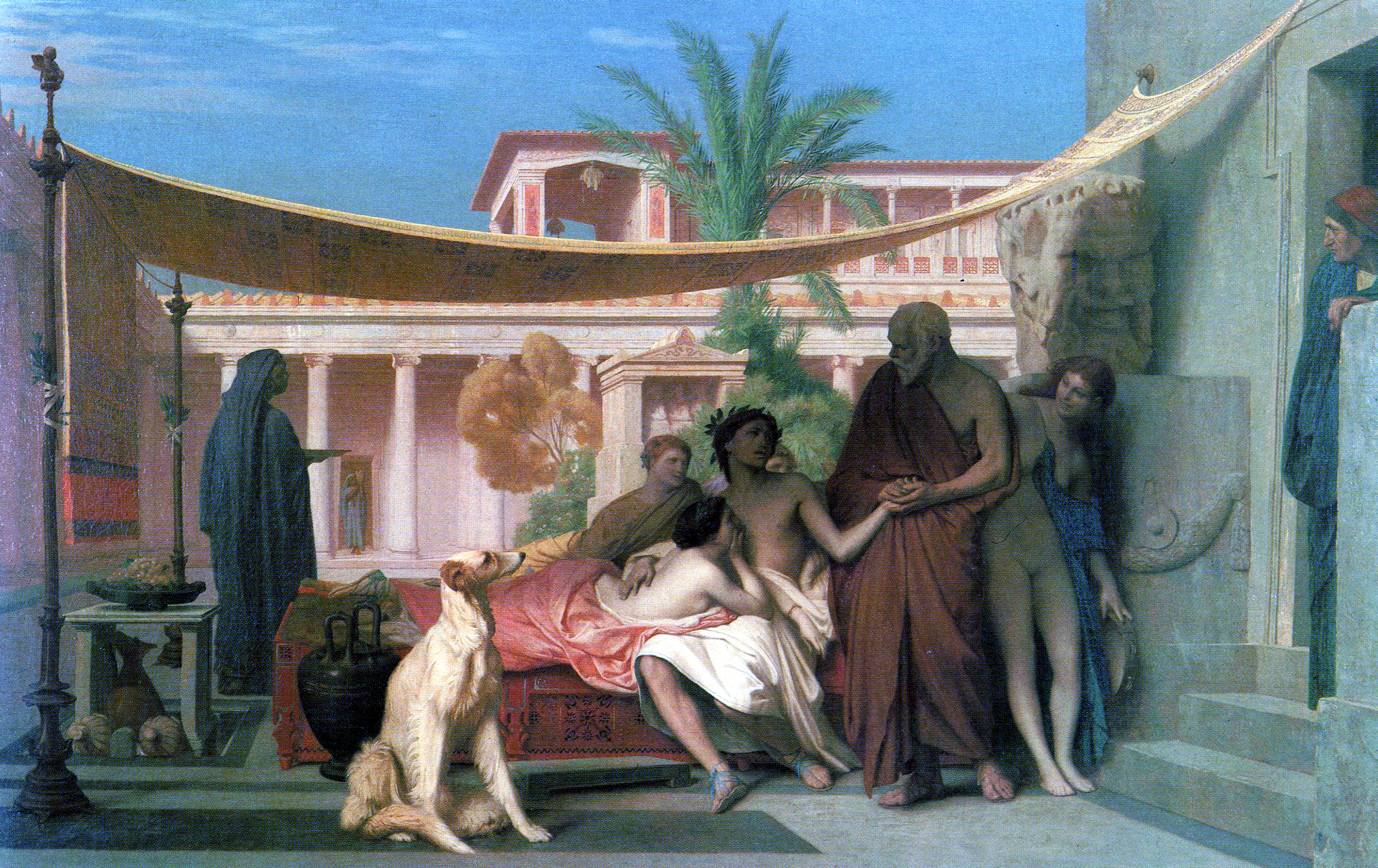
Socrates Seeking Alcibiades in the House of Aspasia, 1861

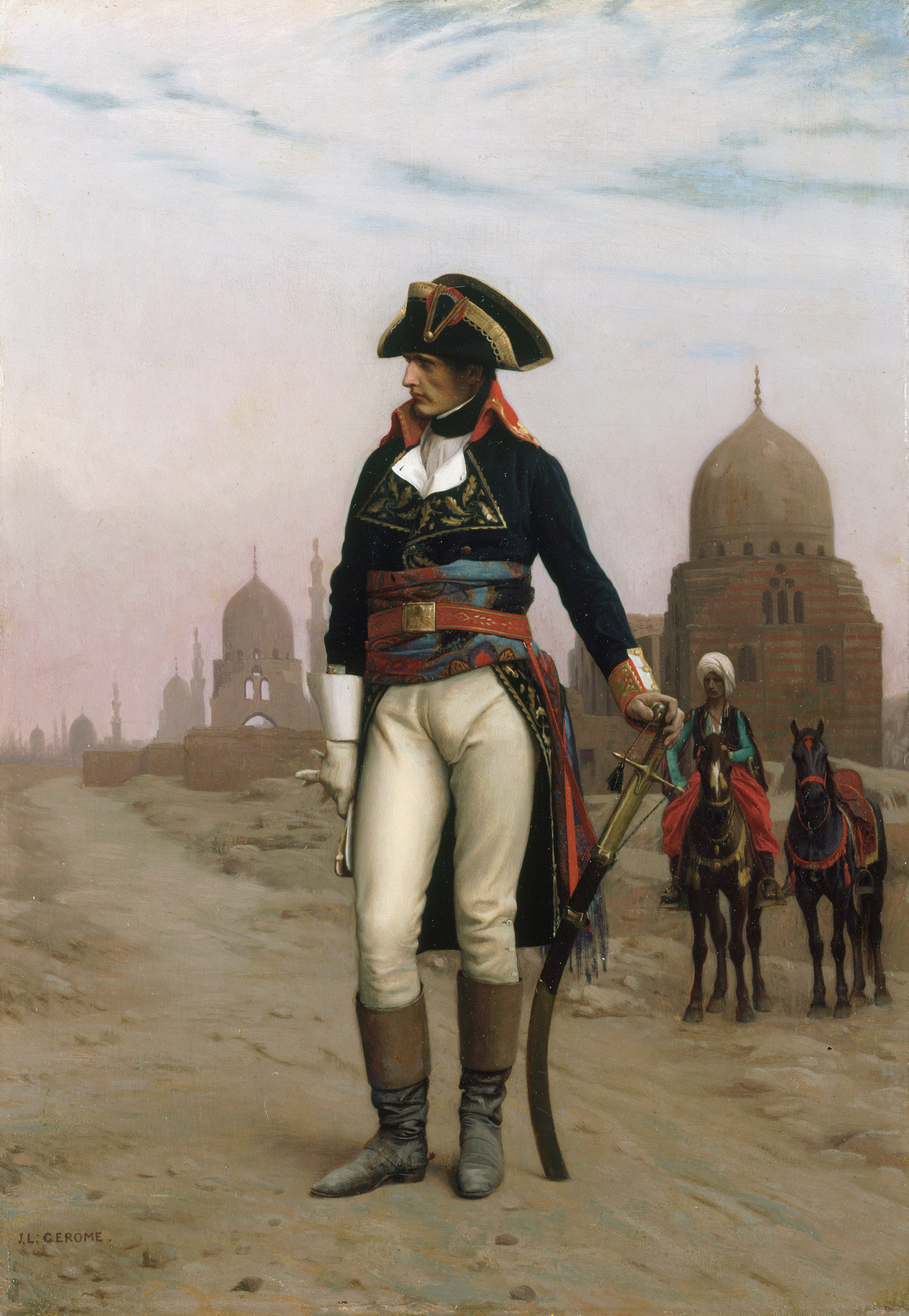
Napoleon in Egypt, c. 1863, Princeton University Art Museum

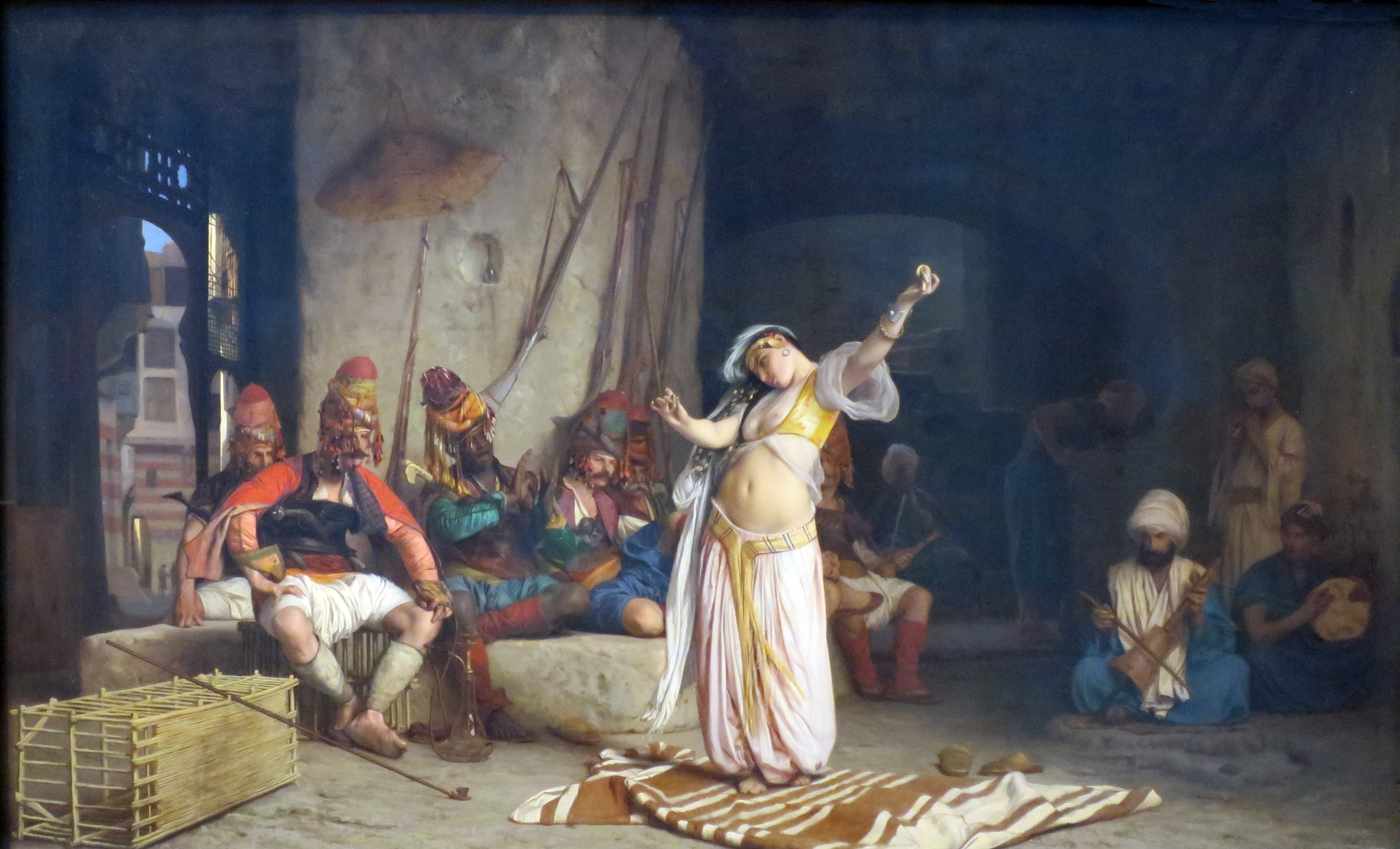
Dance of the Almeh, 1863, Dayton Art Institute

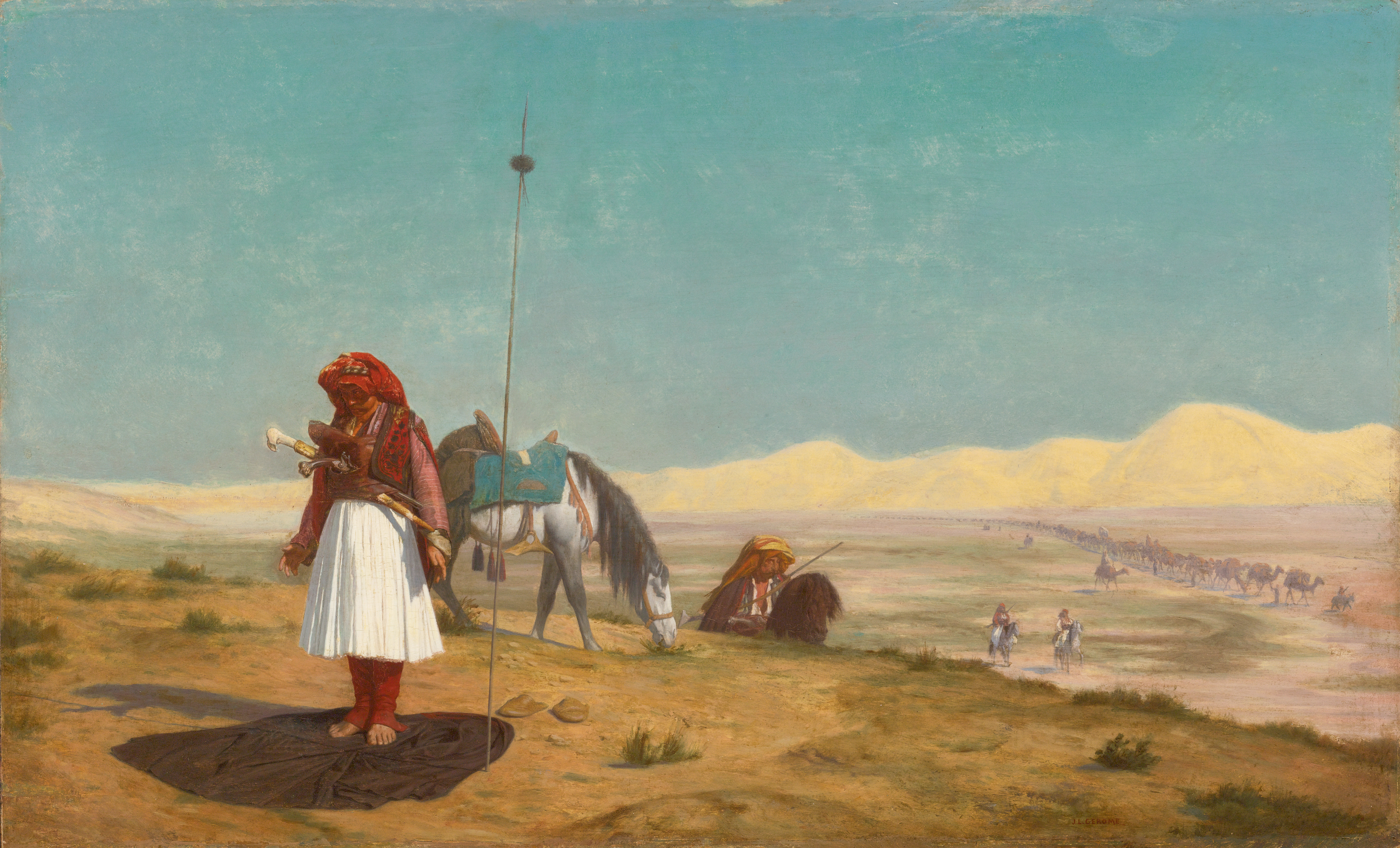
Prayer in the Desert, 1863, private collection

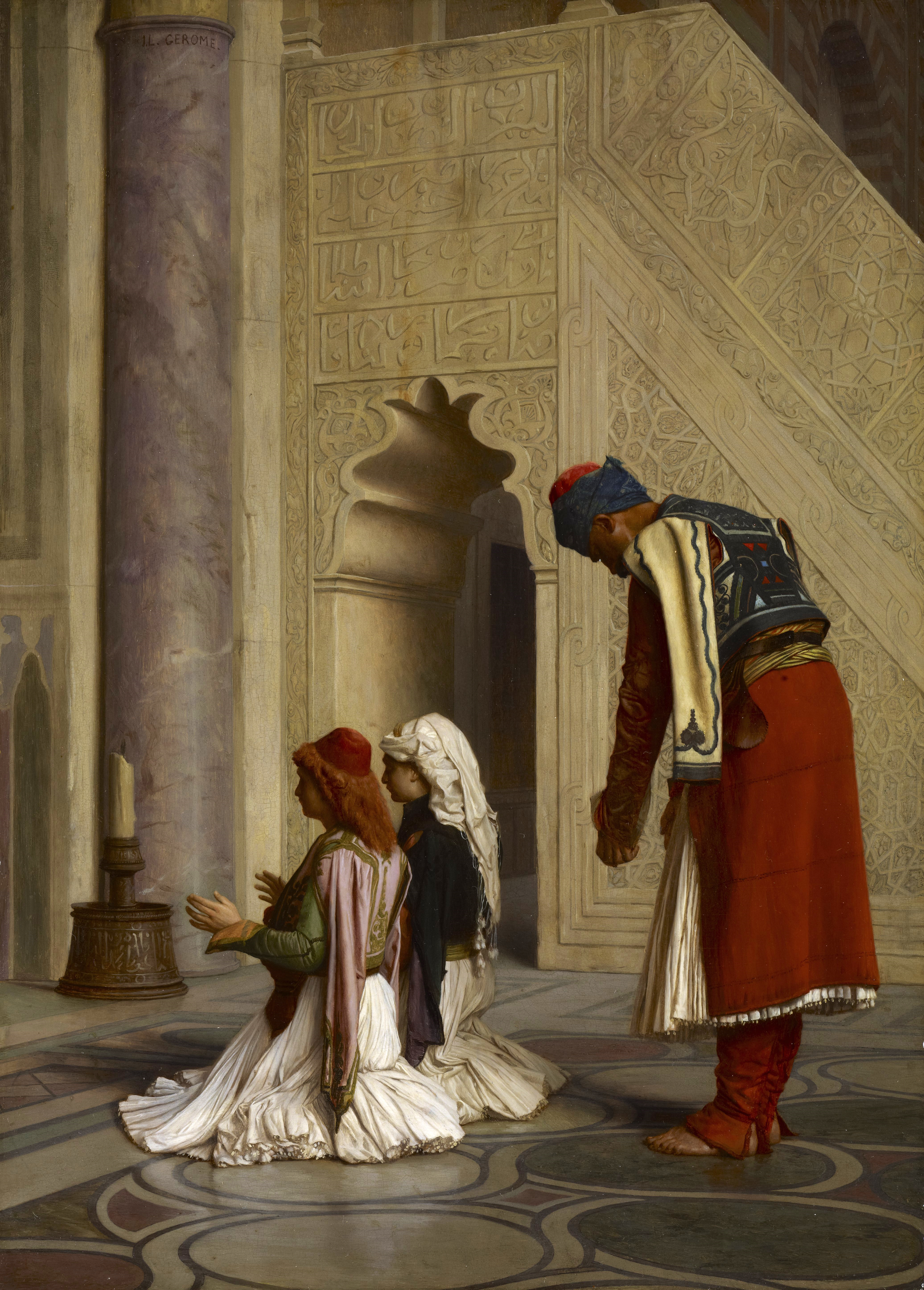
Young Greeks at the Mosque, 1865, Minneapolis Institute of Art

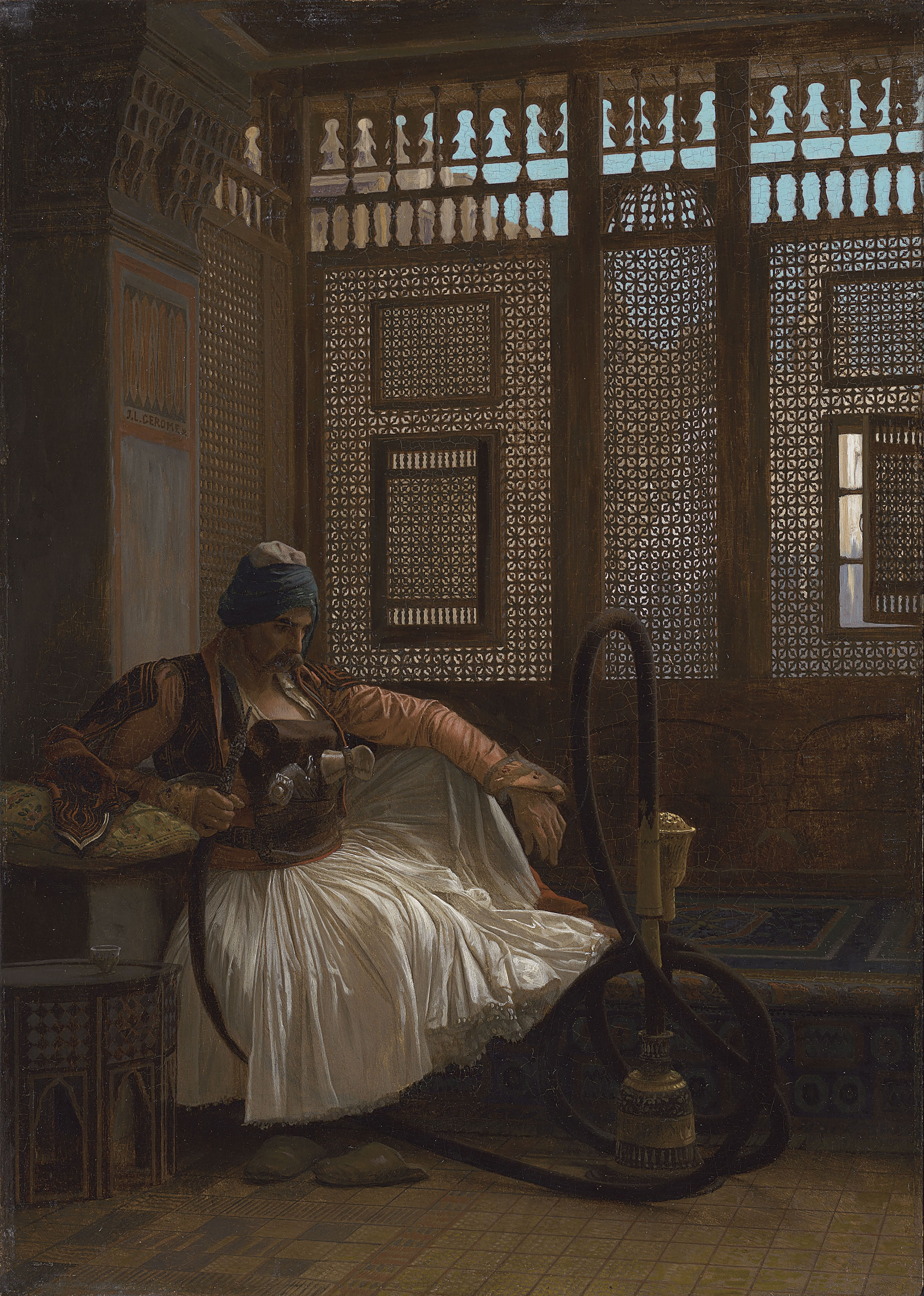
Arnaut Smoking, 1865

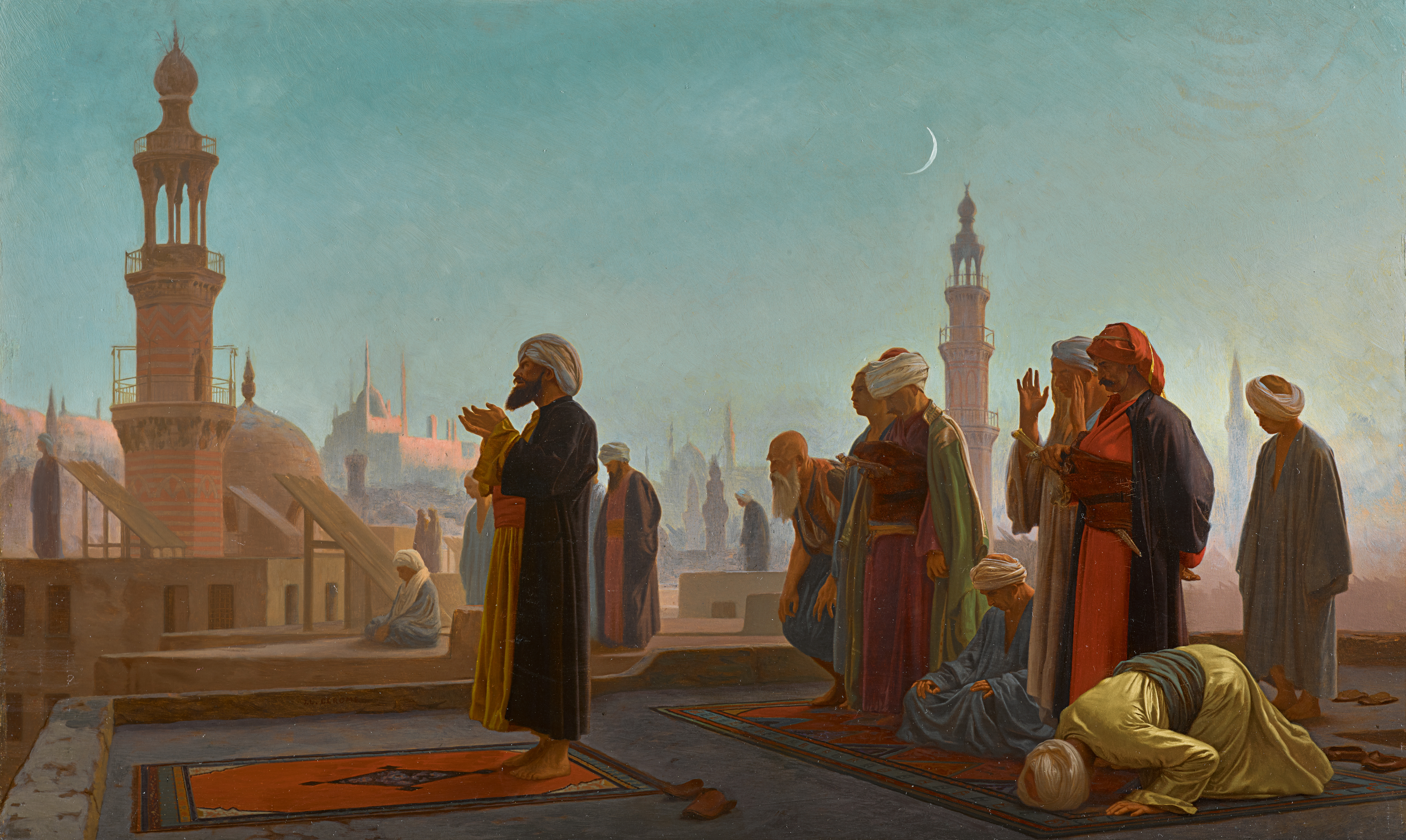
Evening Prayer, Cairo, 1865, private collection

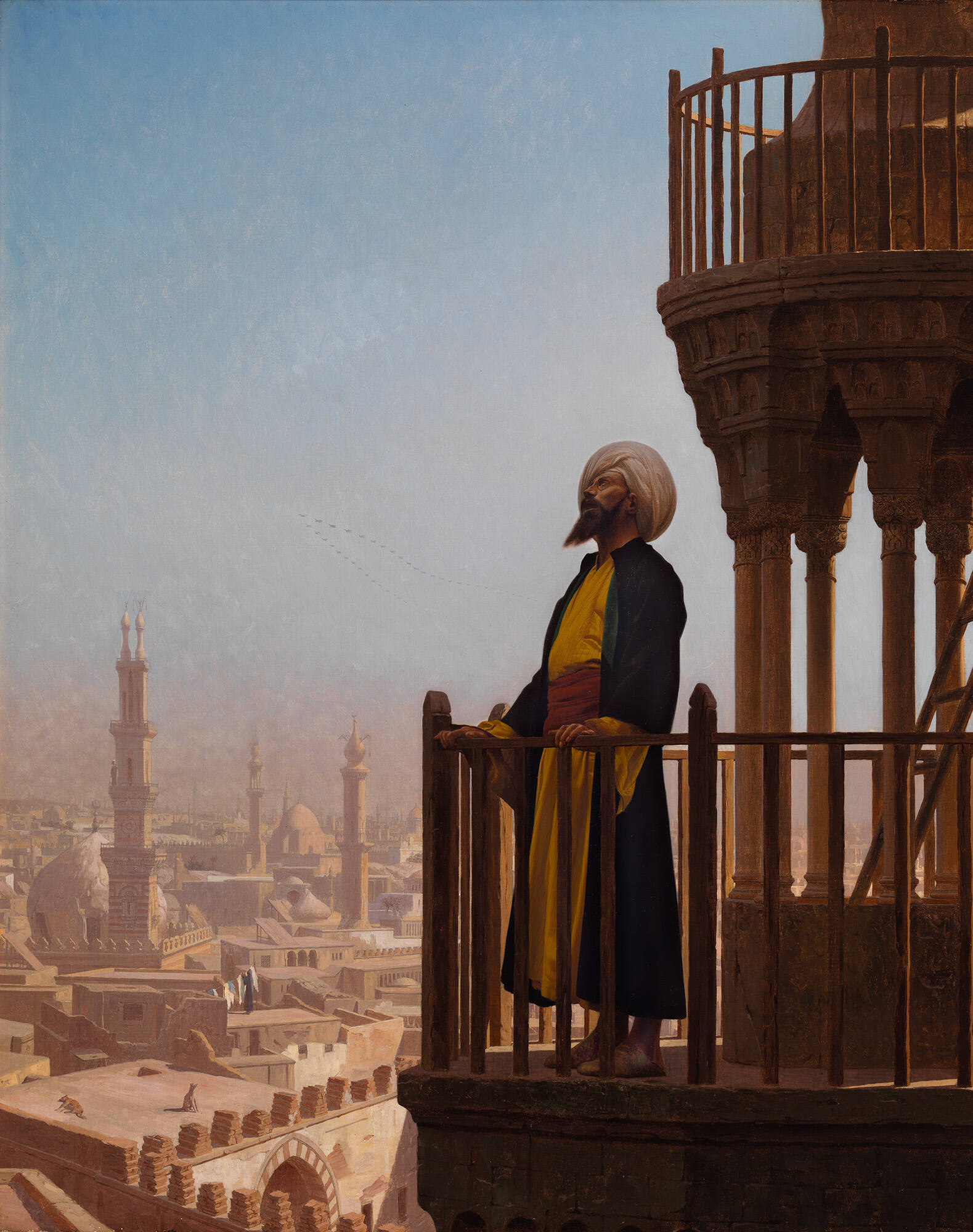
The Muezzin, 1865, Joslyn Art Museum

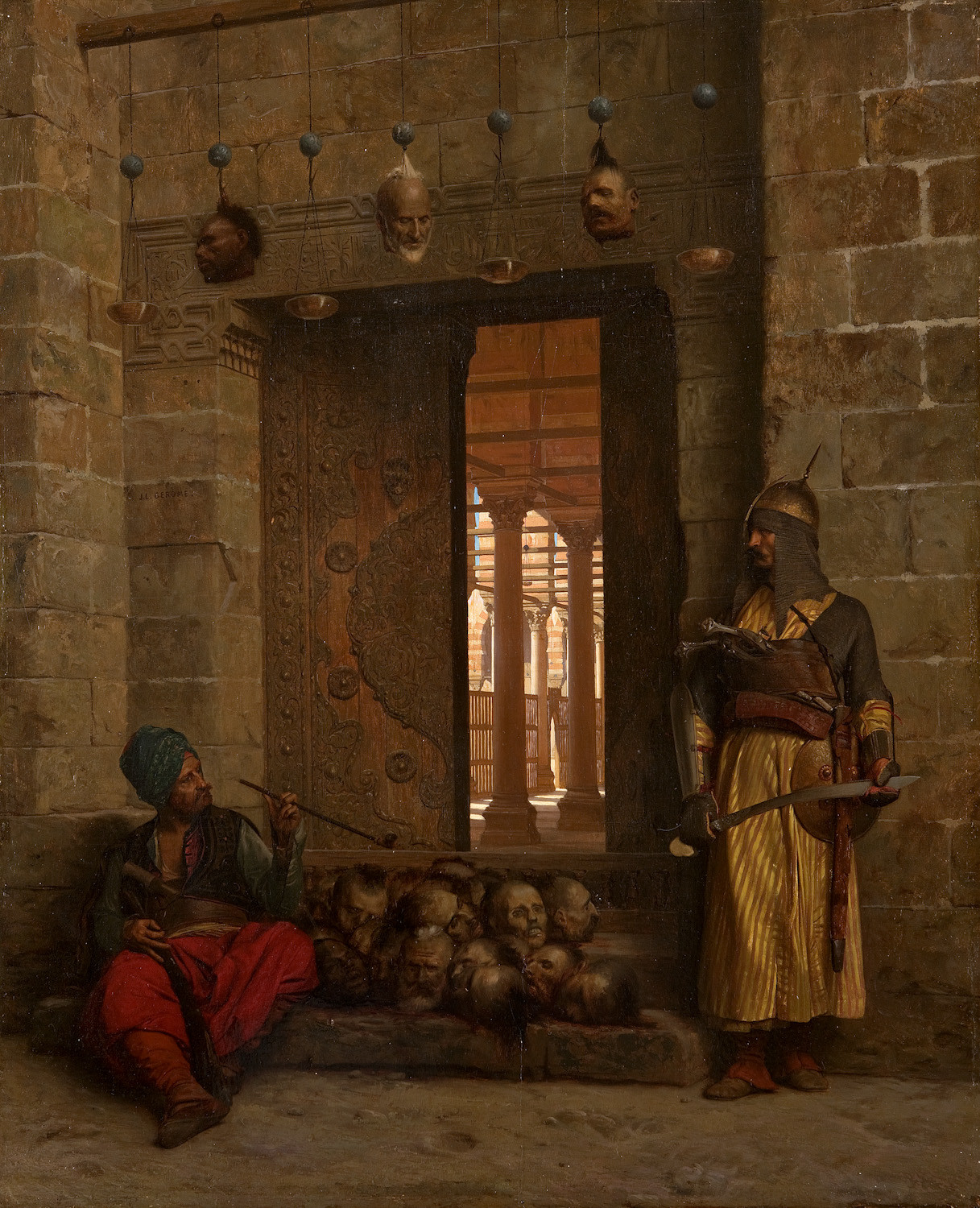
Heads of the Rebel Beys at the Mosque of El Hasanein, Cairo, 1866

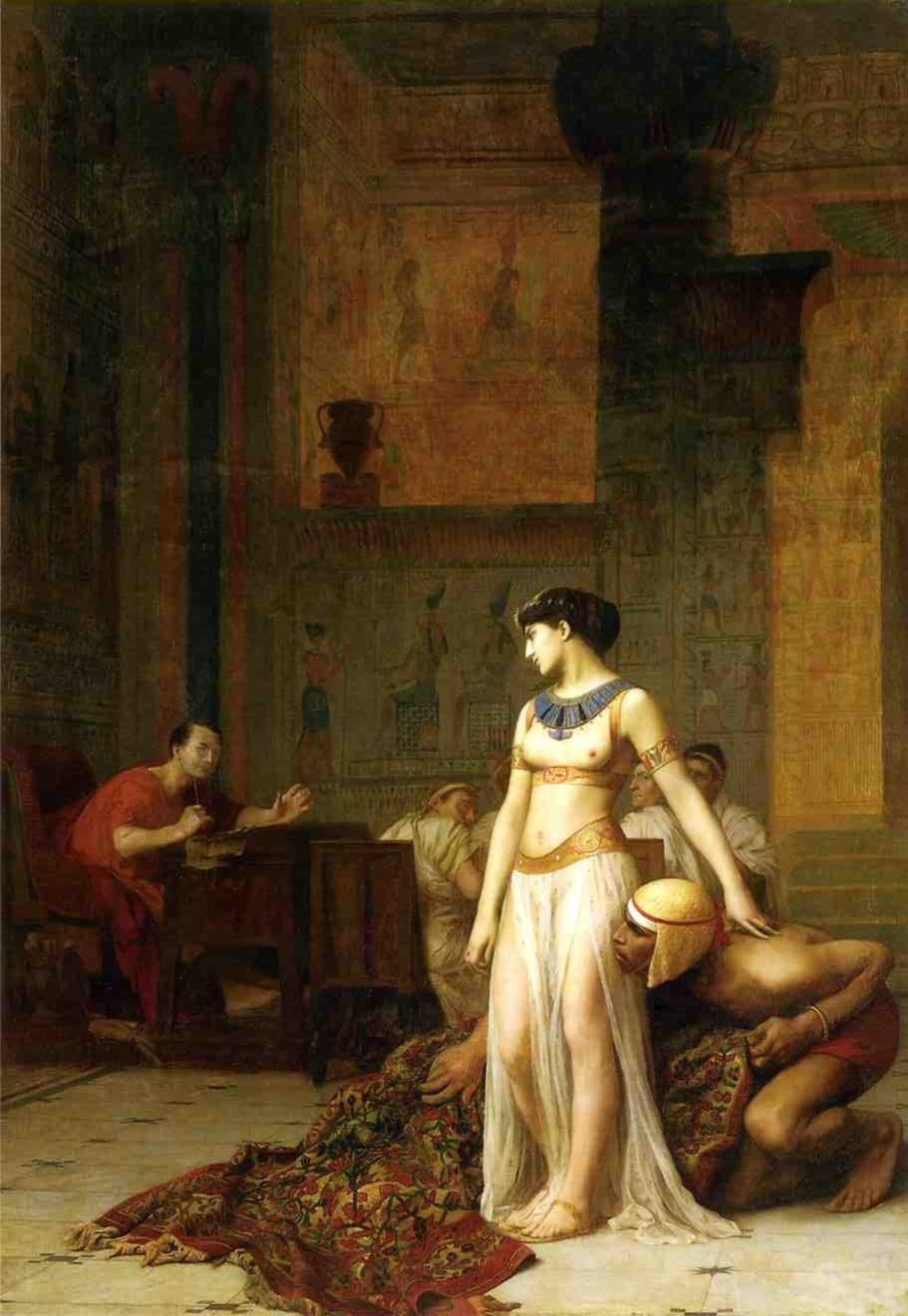
Cleopatra and Caesar, 1866, private collection

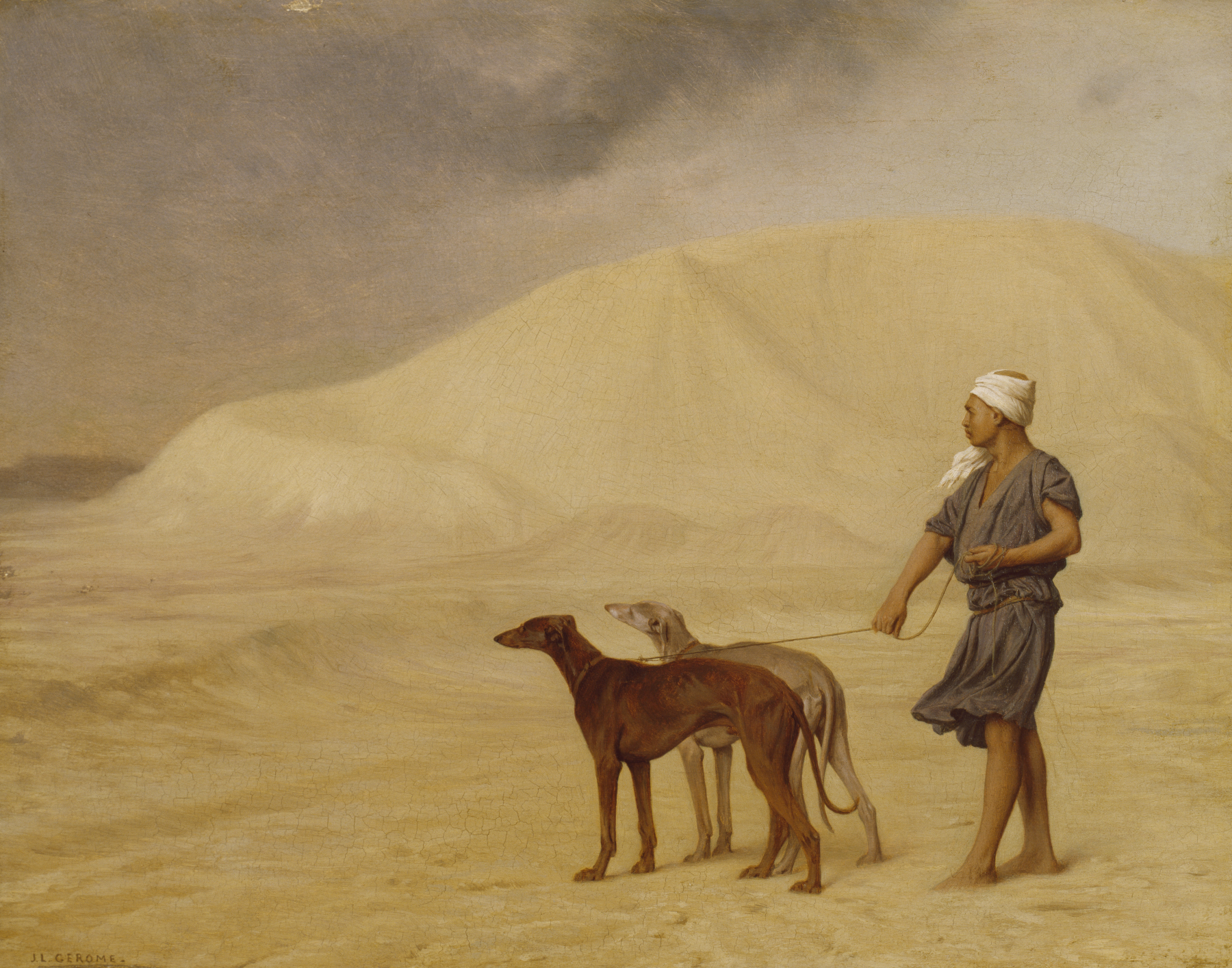
On the Desert, before 1867, Walters Art Museum

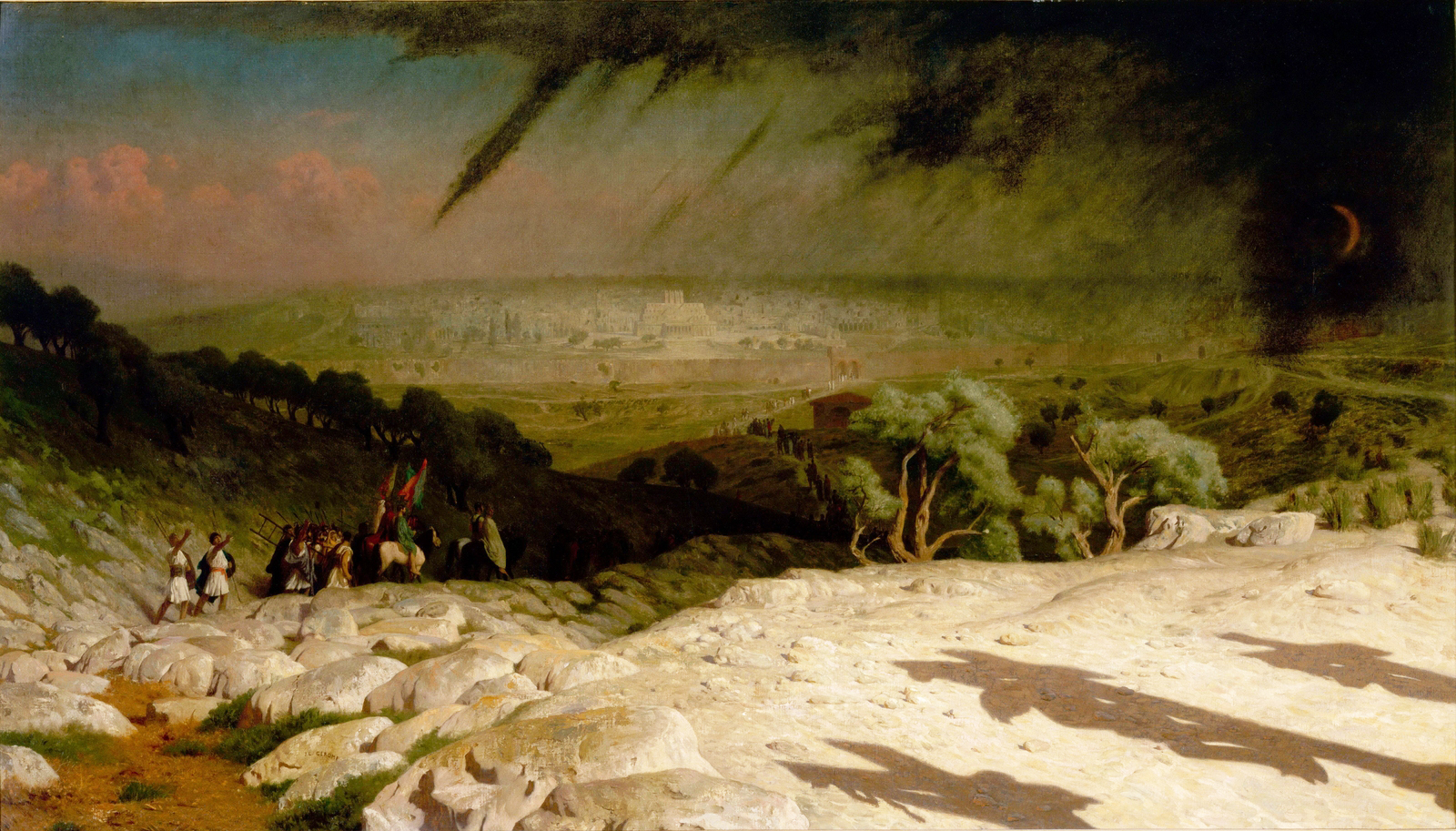
Golgotha ("It is Finished") aka Jerusalem, 1867, Musée d'Orsay

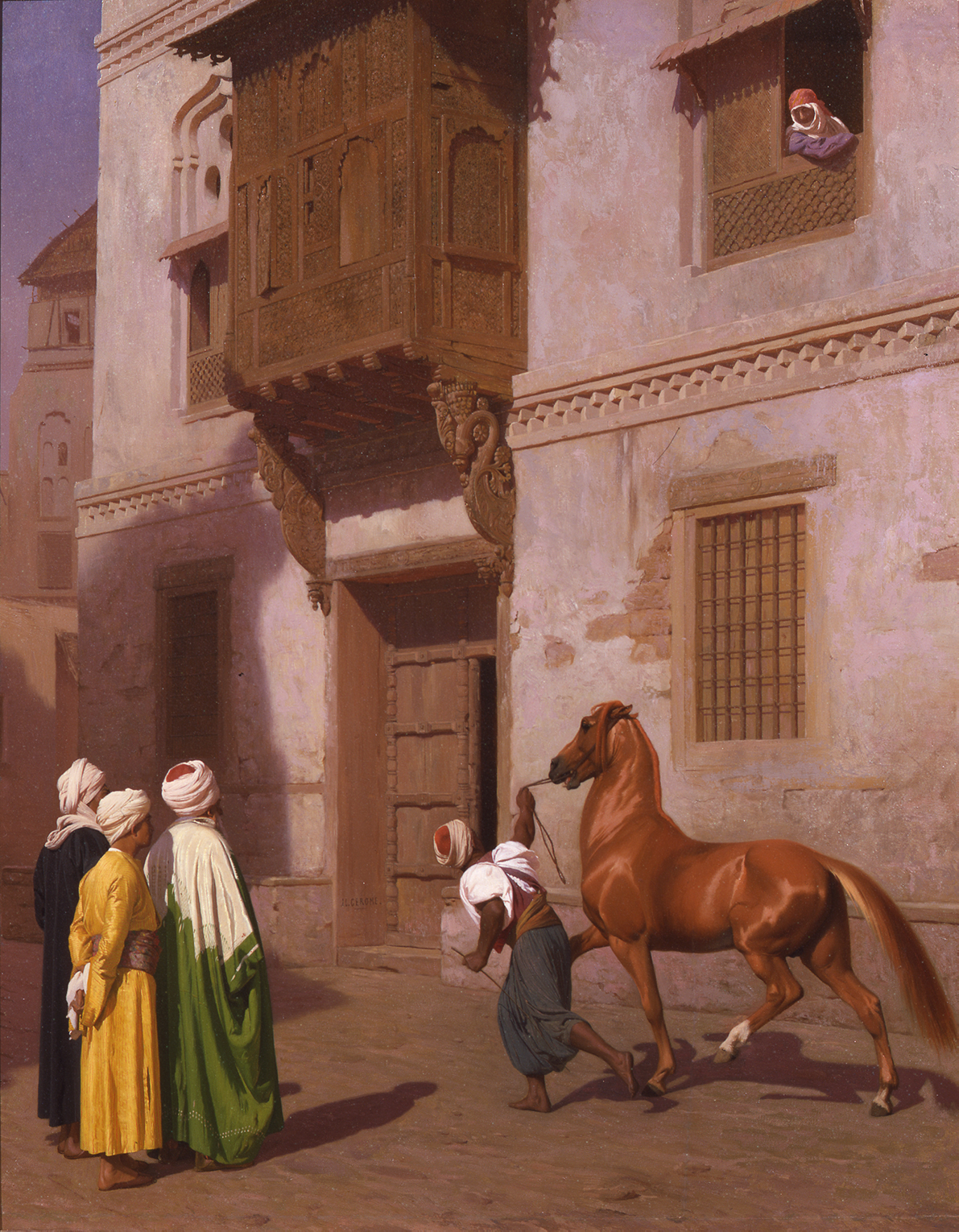
The Horse Market, 1867, Haggin Museum

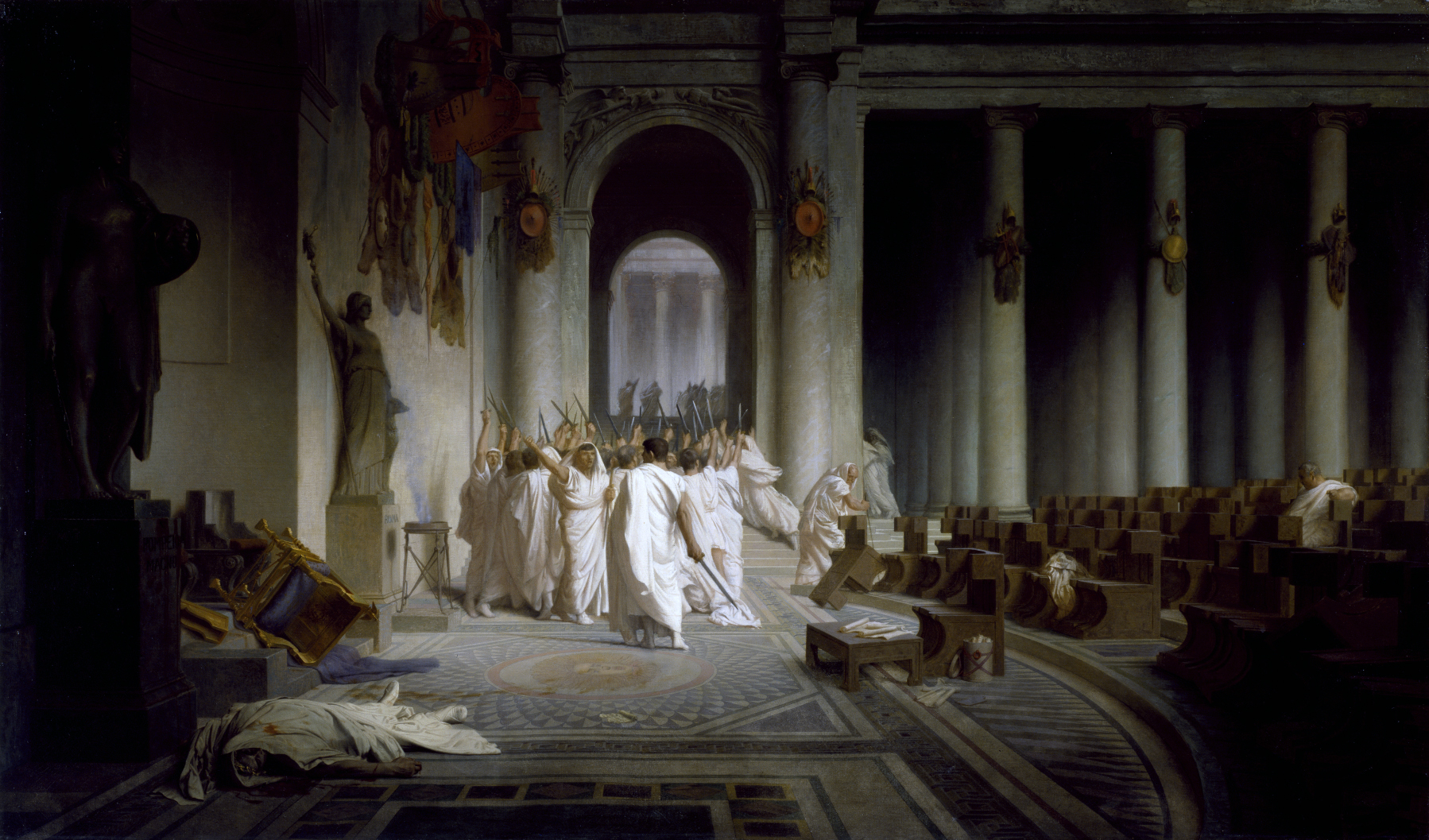
The Death of Caesar, 1867, Walters Art Museum

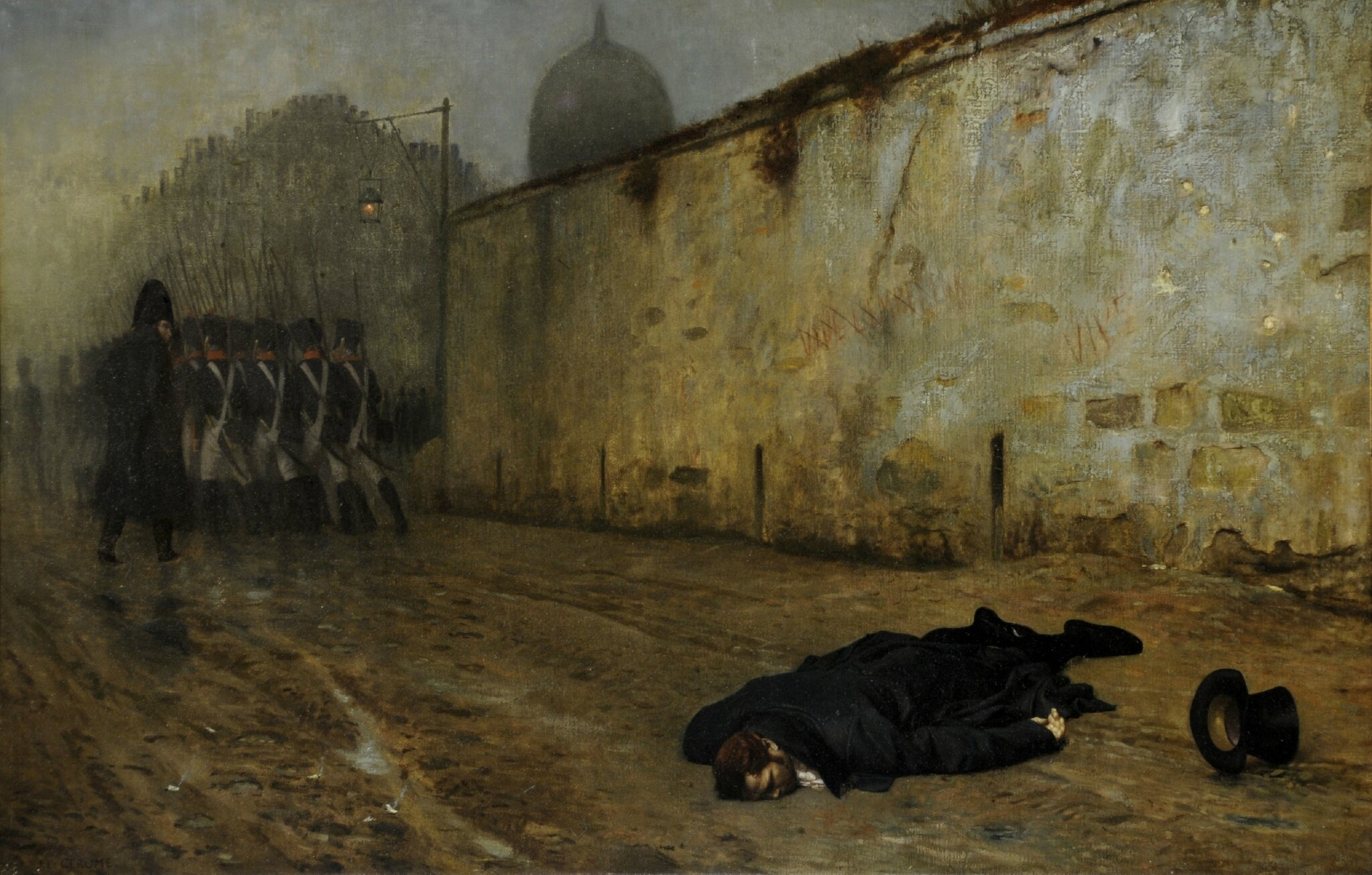
The Execution of Marshal Ney, 1868, Graves Art Gallery

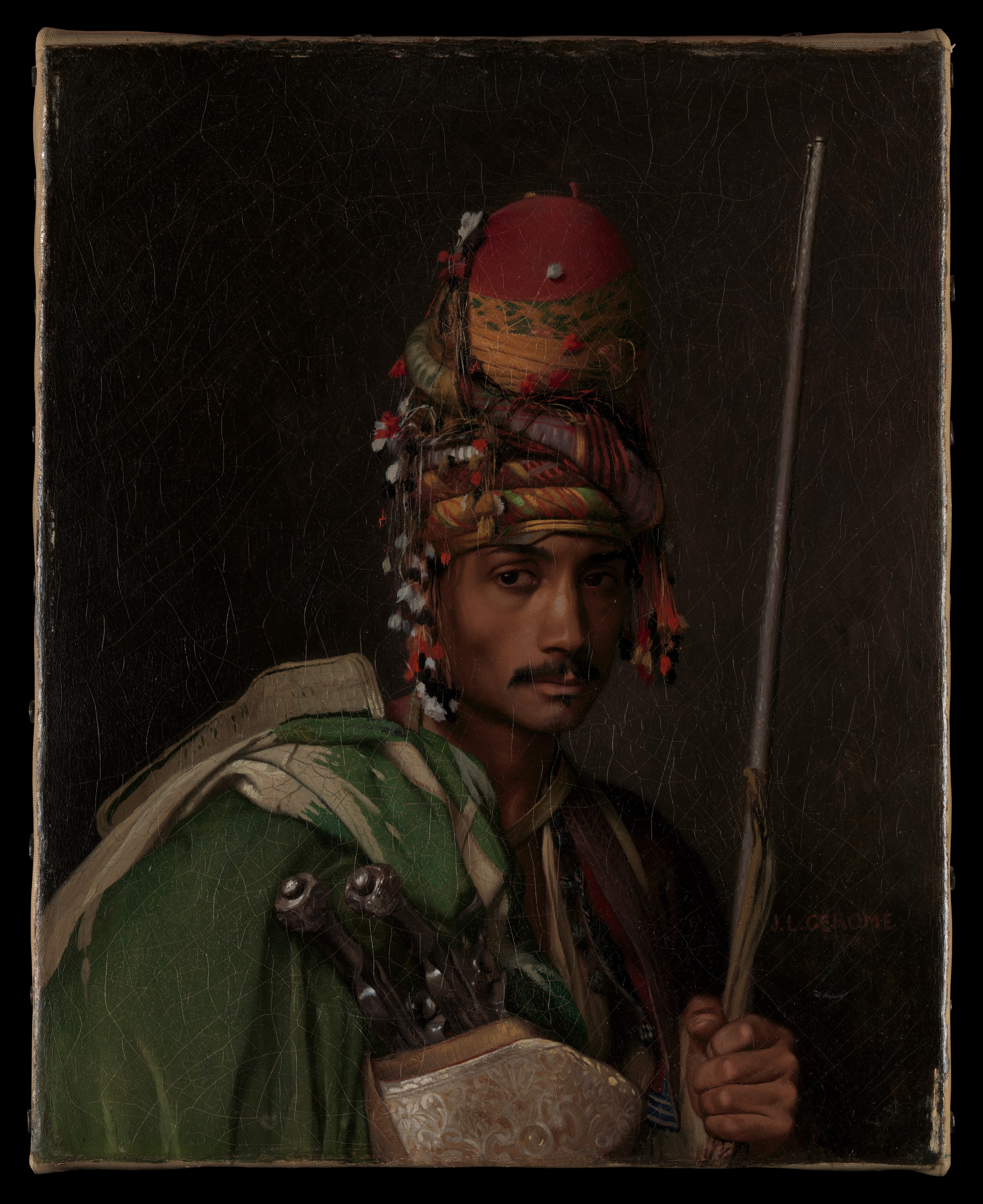
Bashi-Bazouk, 1868–1869, Metropolitan Museum of Art

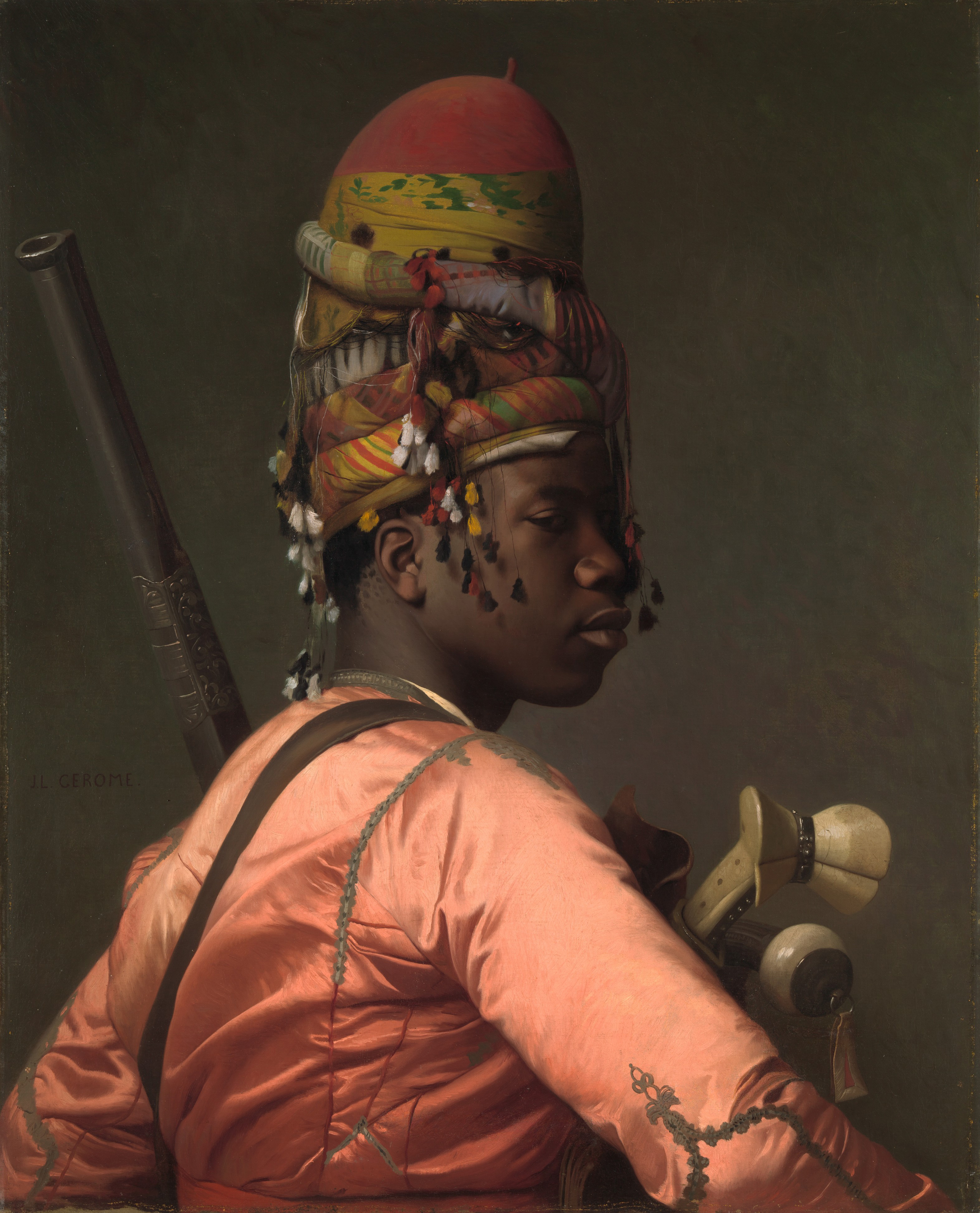
Bashi-Bazouk, 1869, Metropolitan Museum of Art

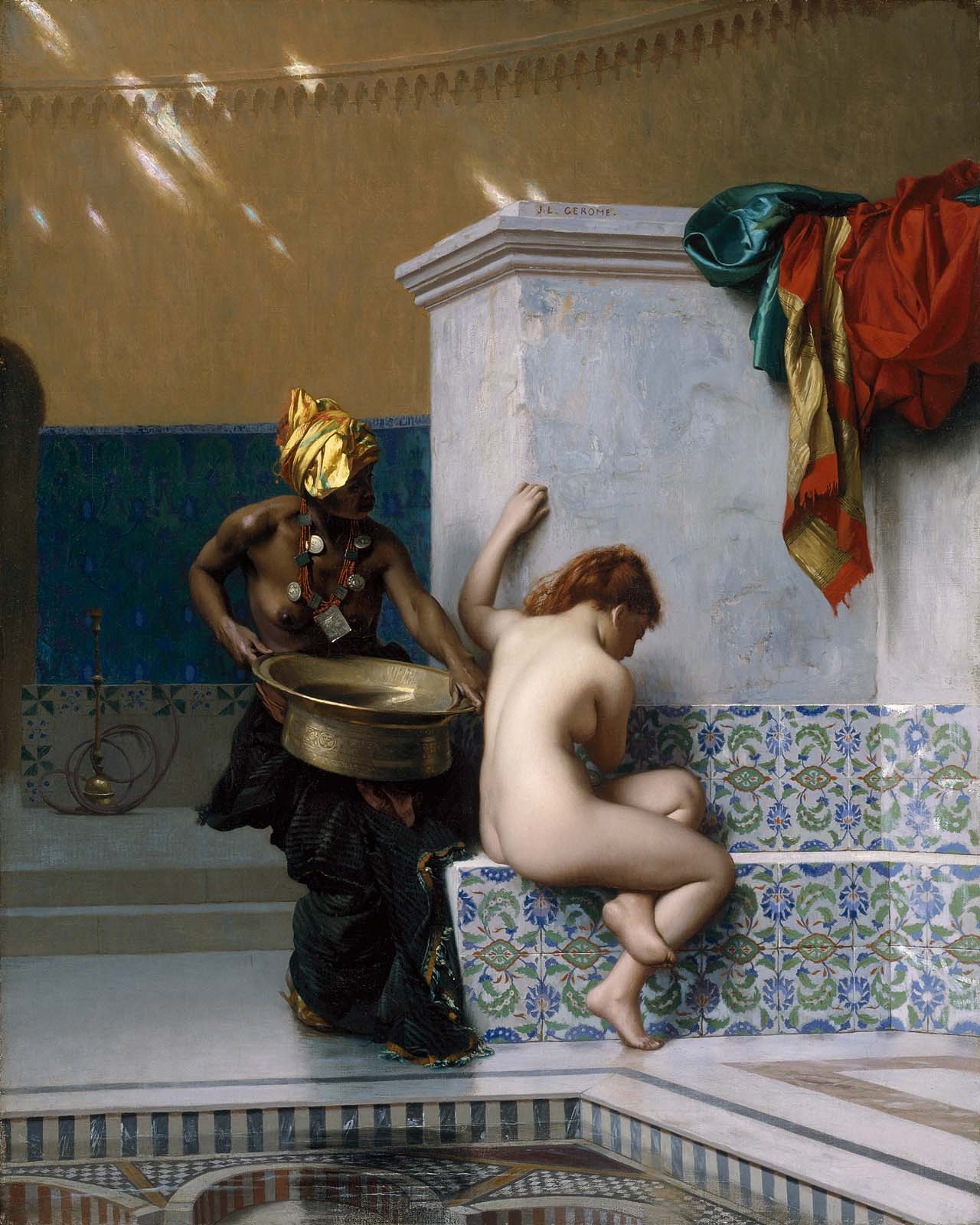
Moorish Bath, (1870), Museum of Fine Arts, Boston

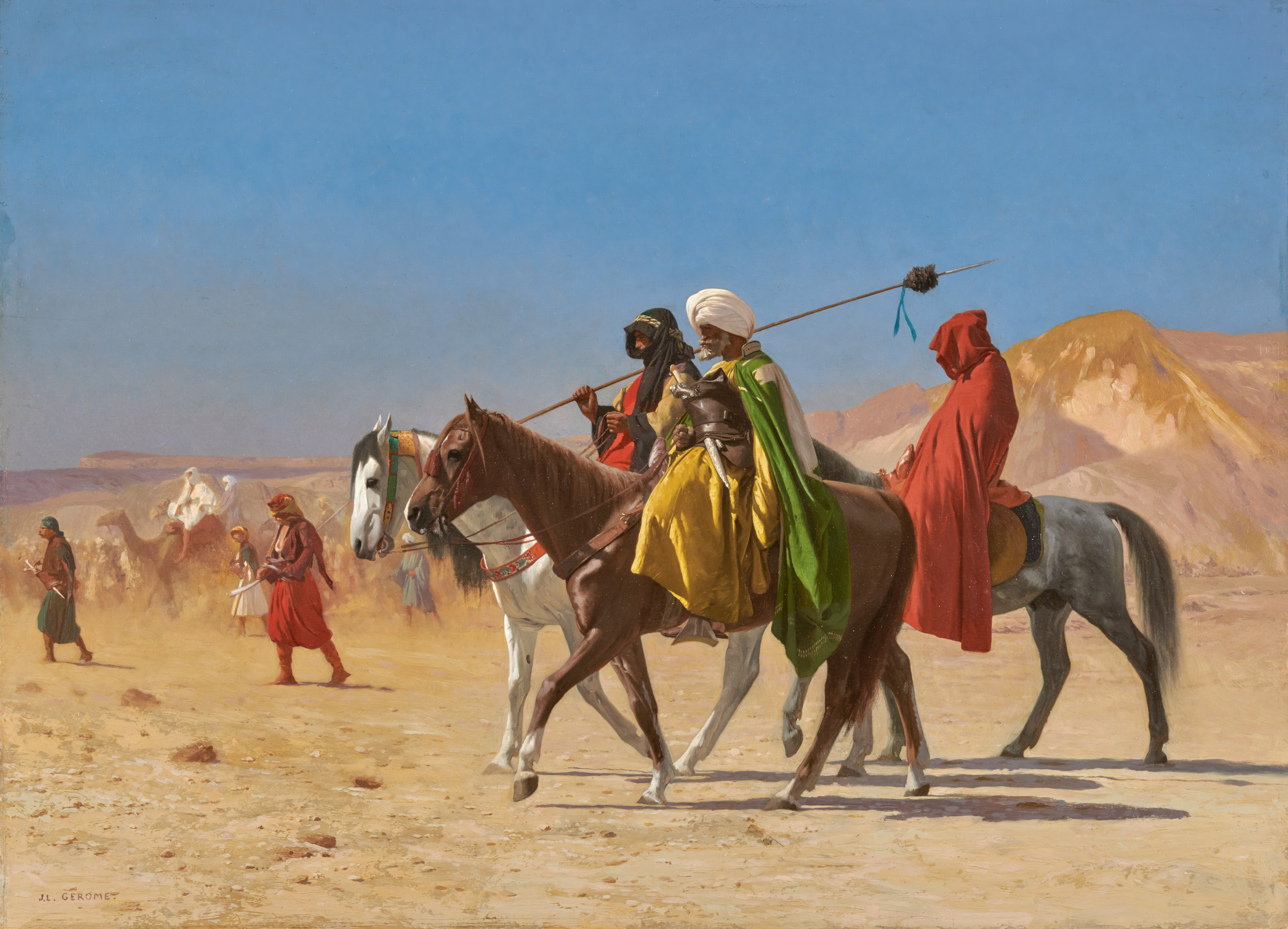
Riders Crossing the Desert, (1870), private collection

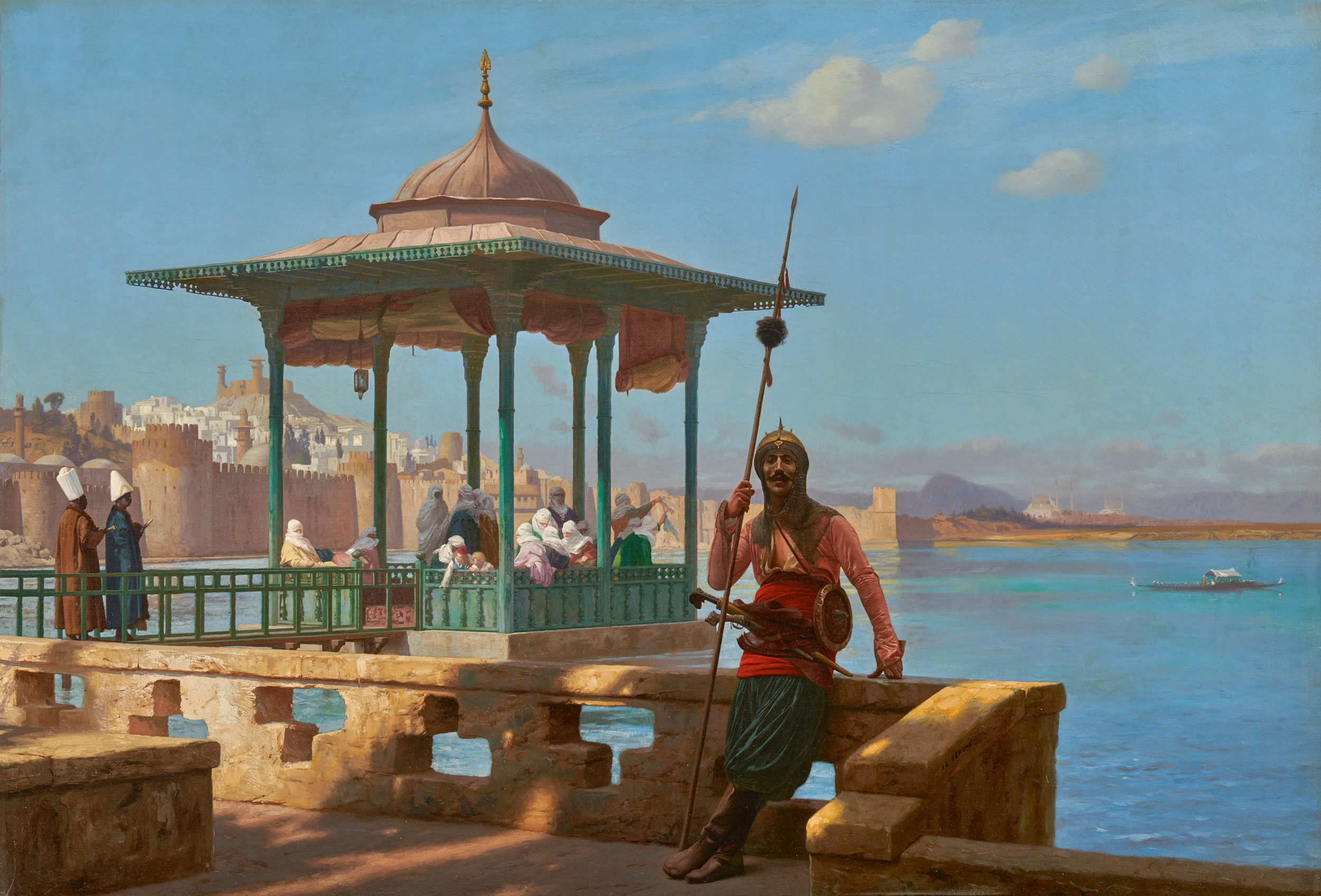
The Harem in the Kiosk, c. 1870–1875, private collection

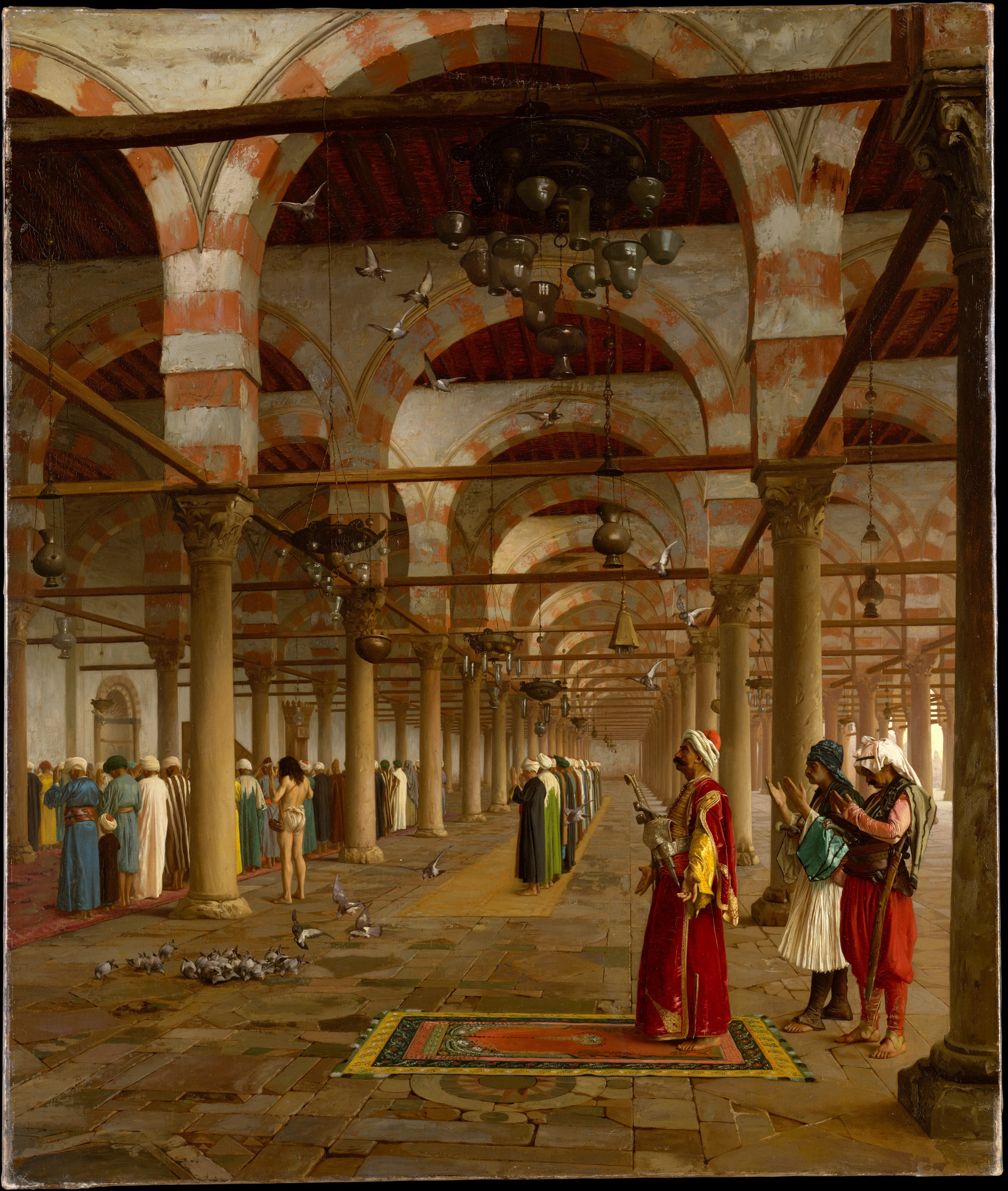
Prayer in the Mosque, 1871, Metropolitan Museum of Art

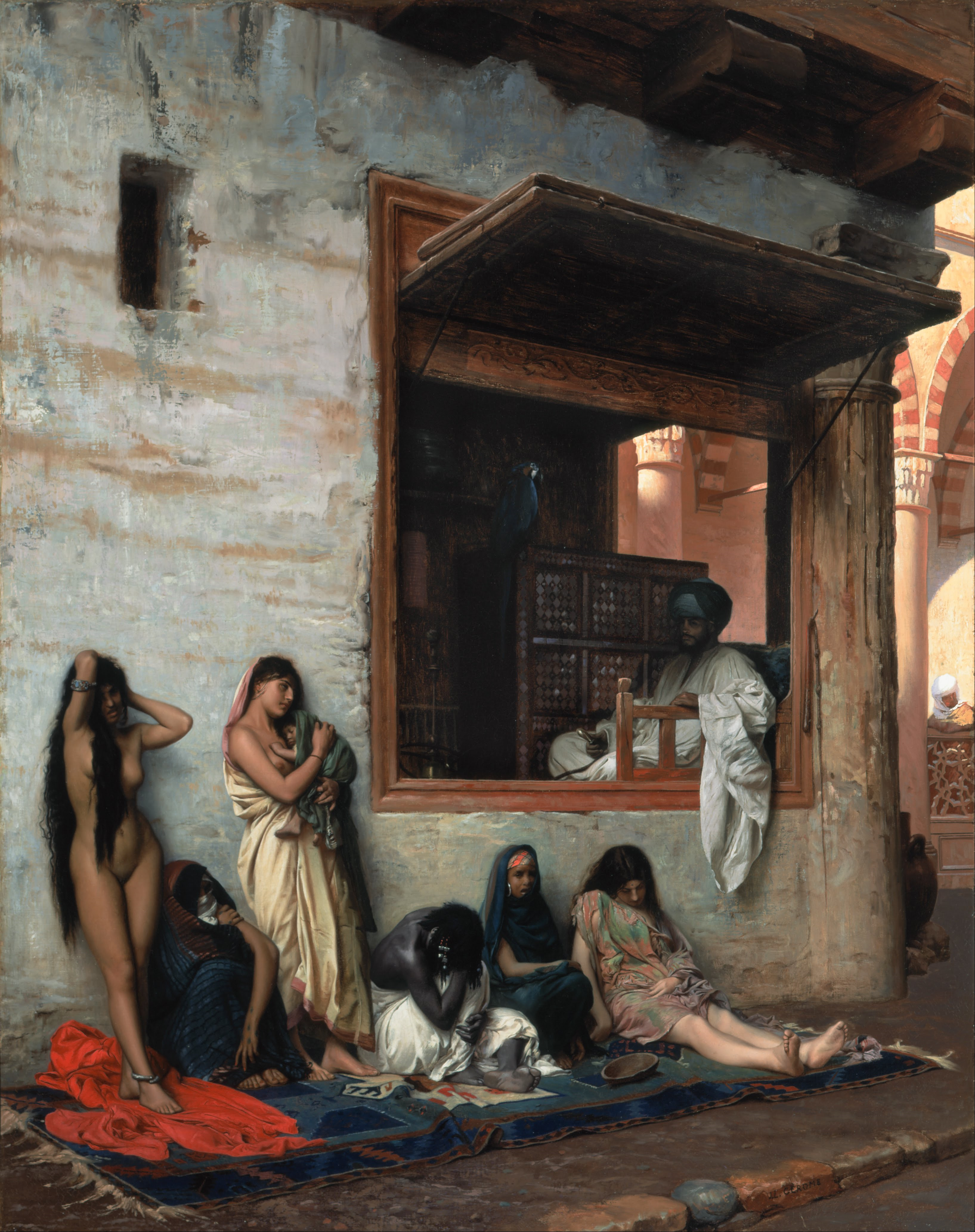
The Slave Market, 1871, Cincinnati Art Museum

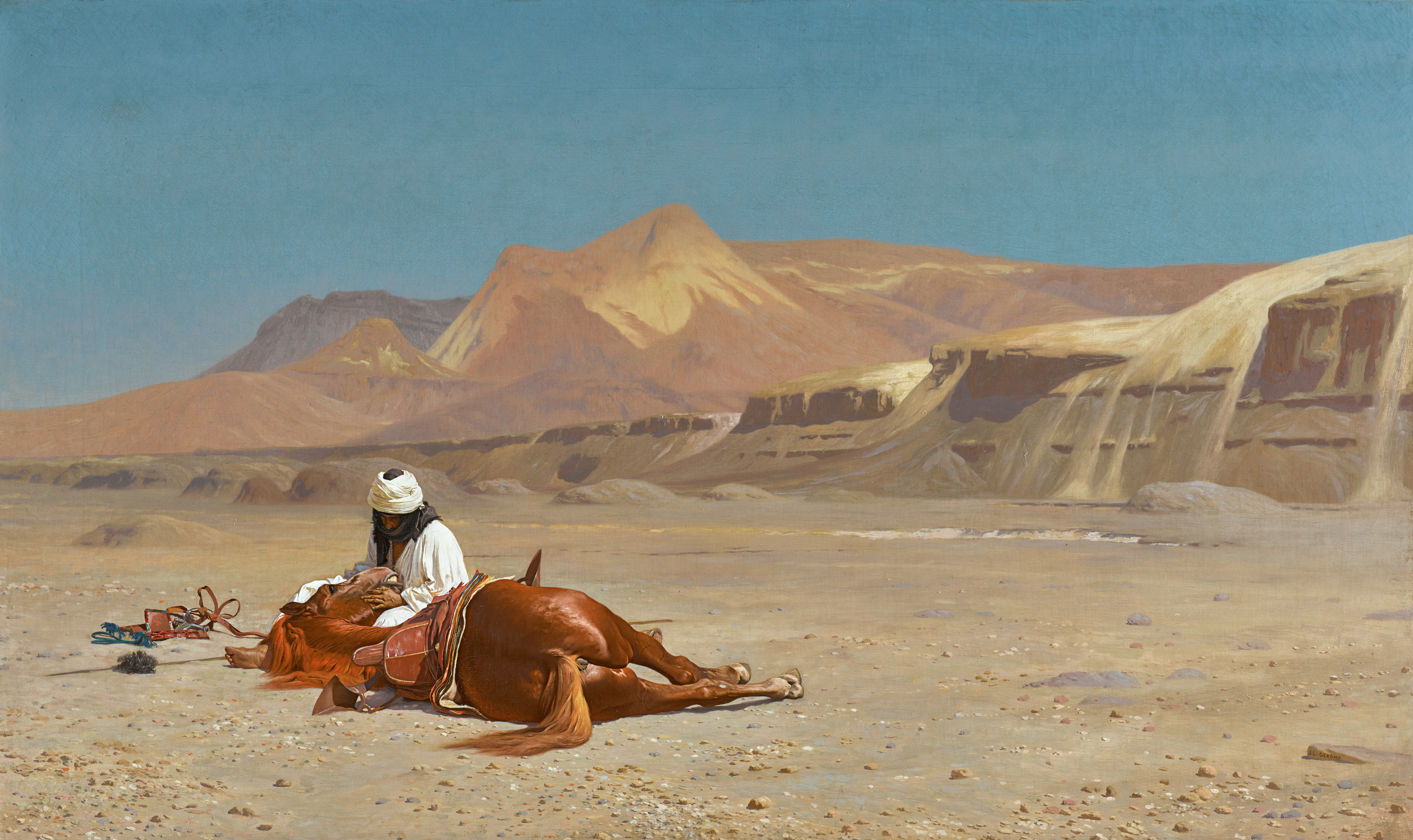
Rider and his Steed in the Desert, 1872, private collection

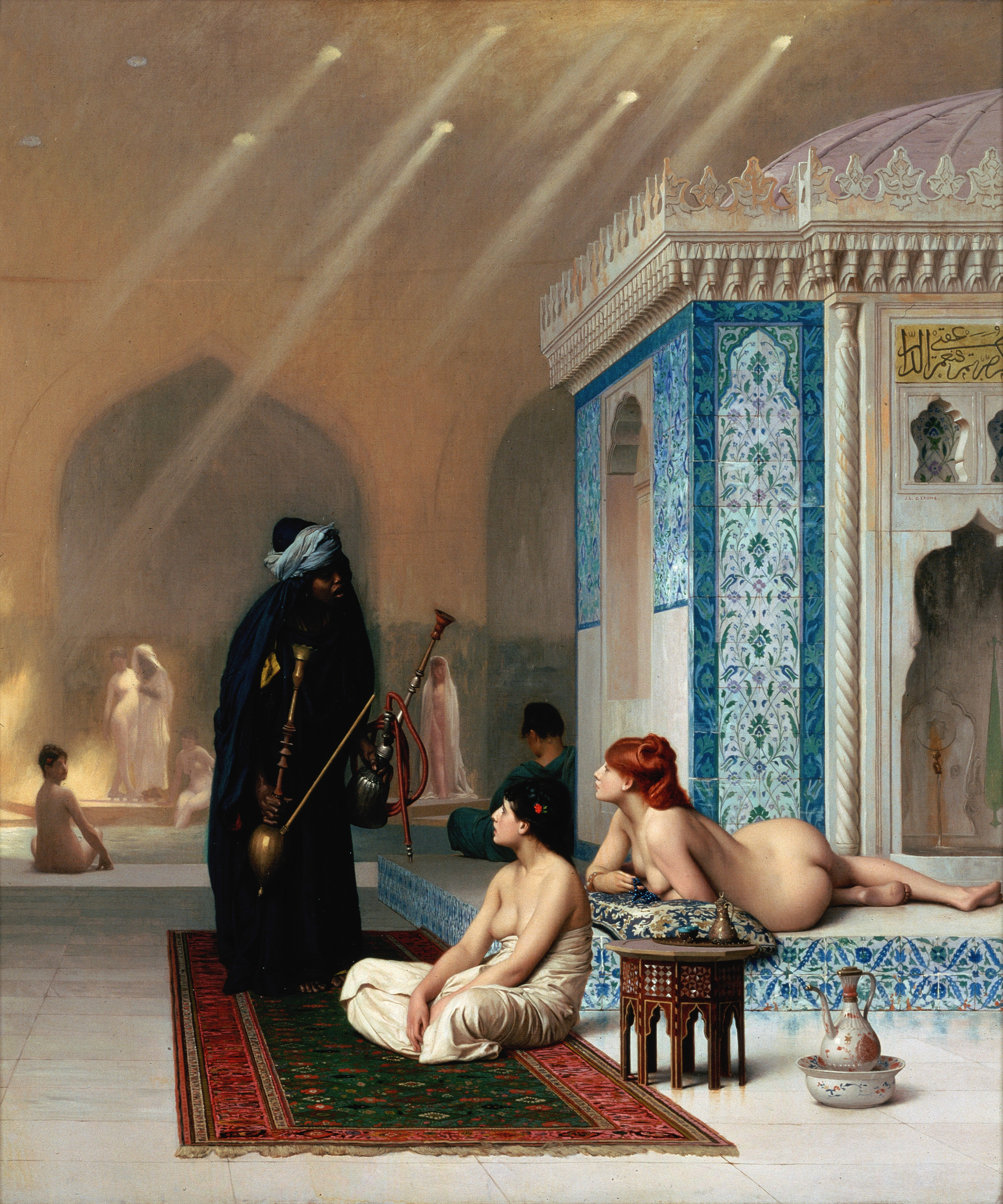
Pool in a Harem, 1876, Hermitage Museum

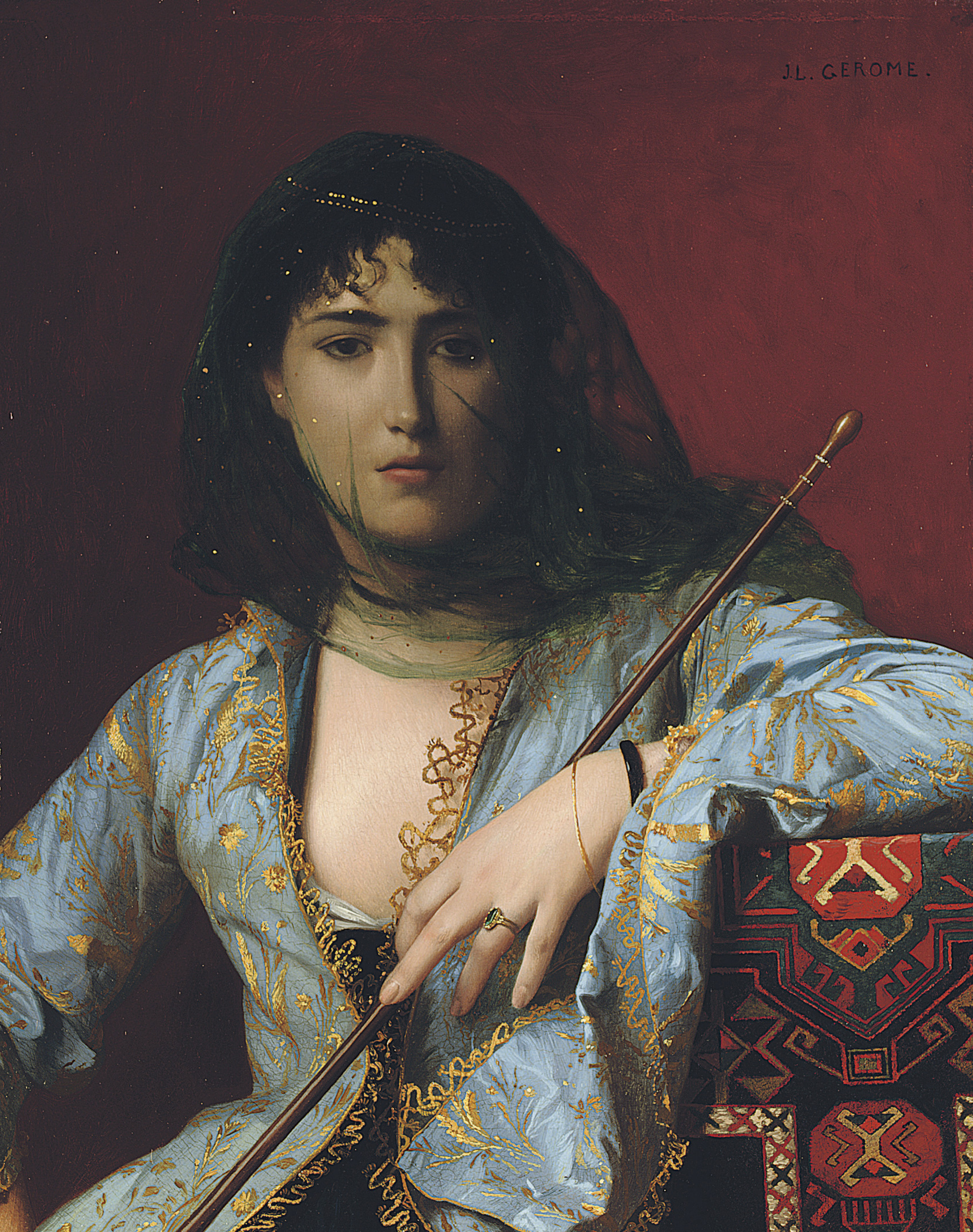
Femme circassienne voilée, 1876, Qatar Museums Authority

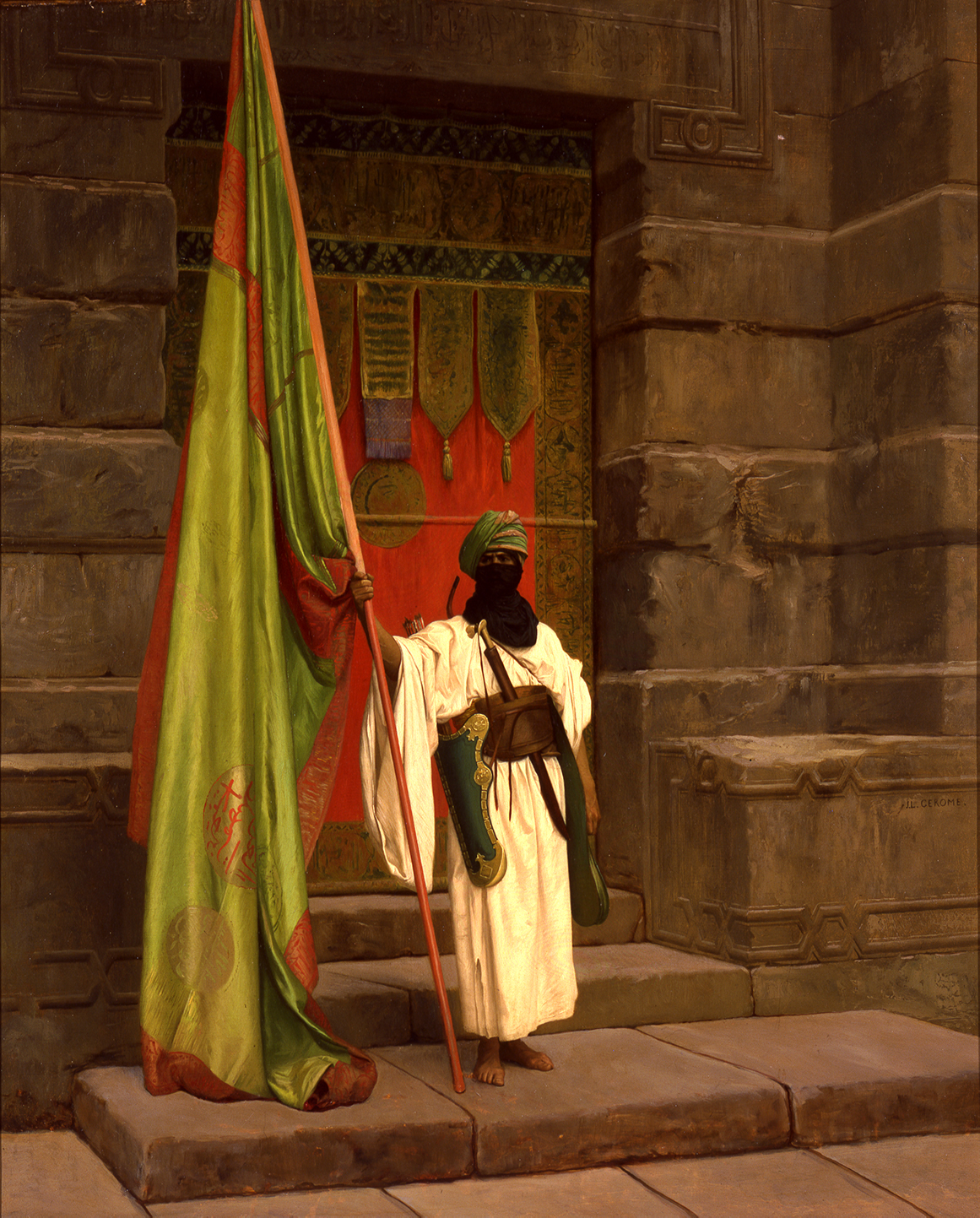
The Standing Bearer, Unfolding the Holy Flag, 1876, Haggin Museum

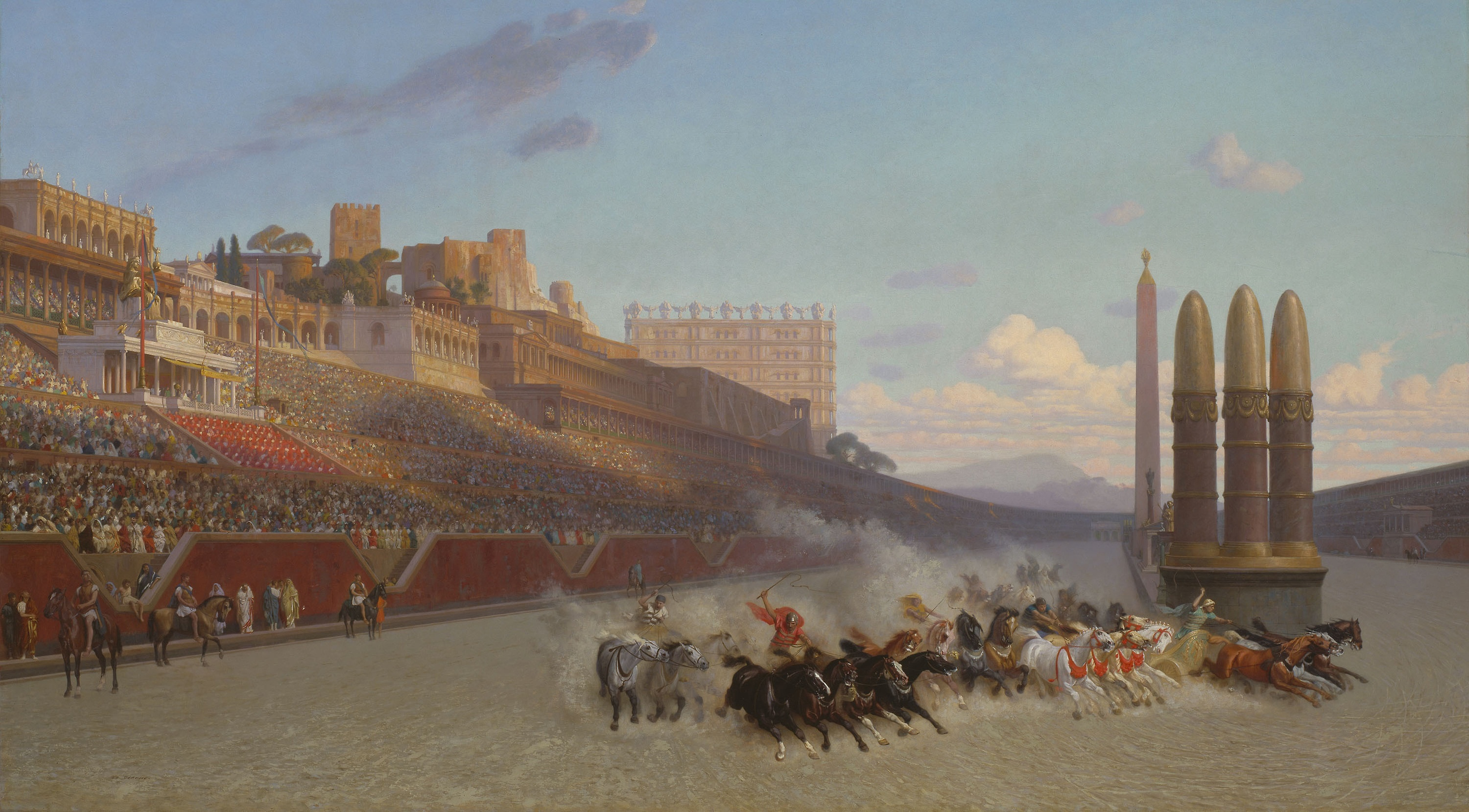
Chariot Race, 1876, Art Institute of Chicago

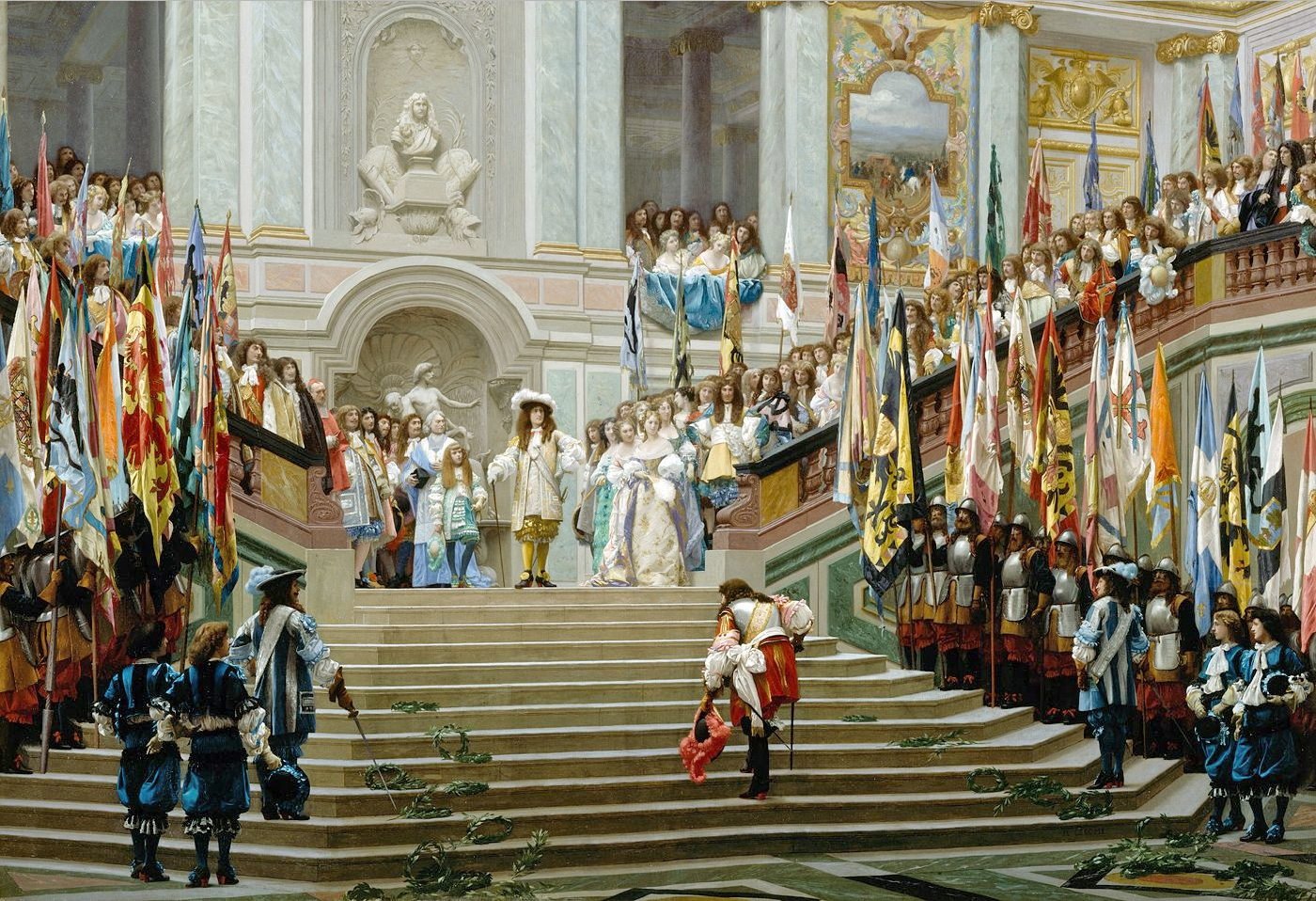
Reception of the Grand Condé at Versailles, 1878, Musée d'Orsay

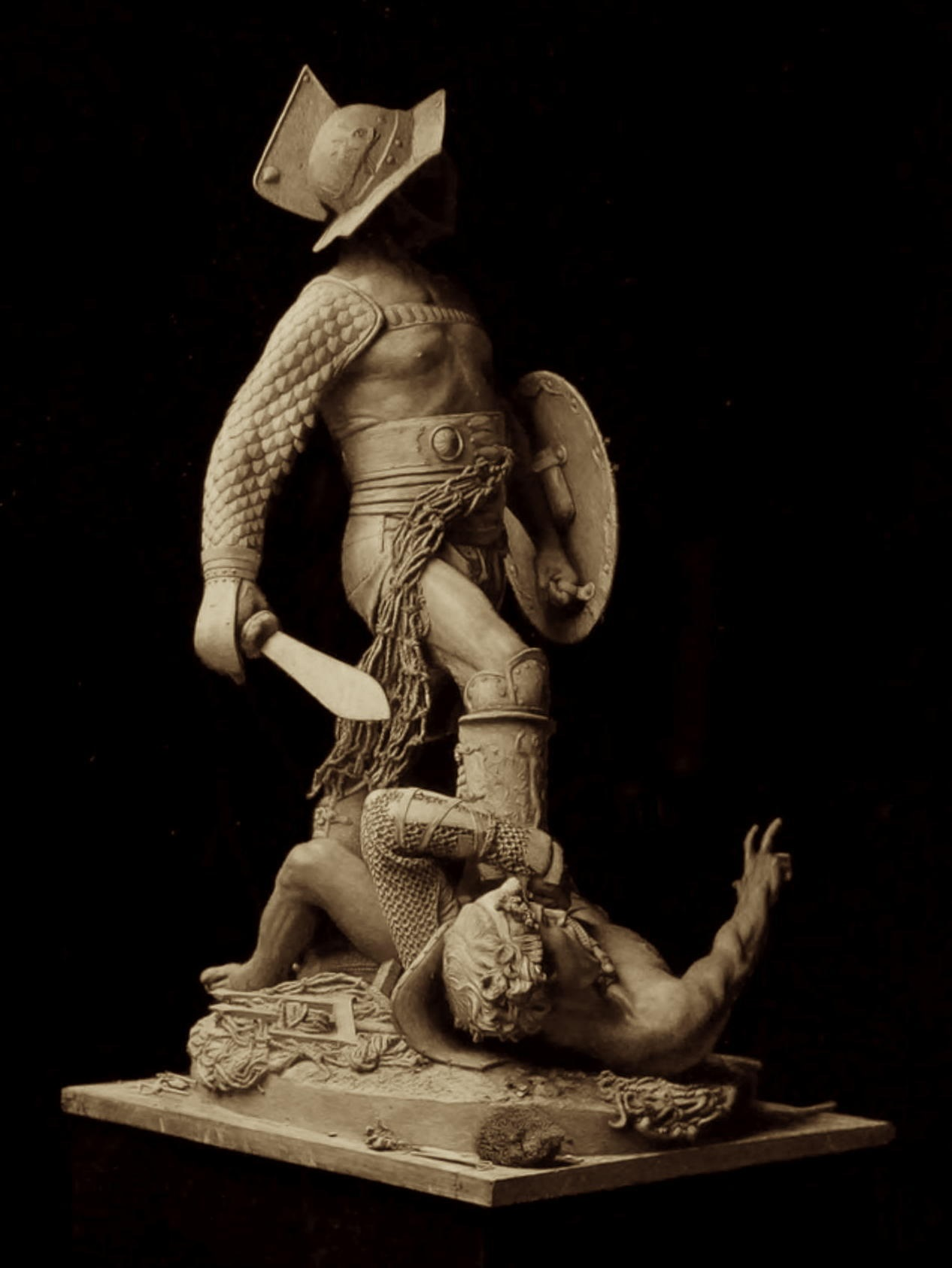
The Gladiators, bronze, 1878, photogravure Goupil c. 1892

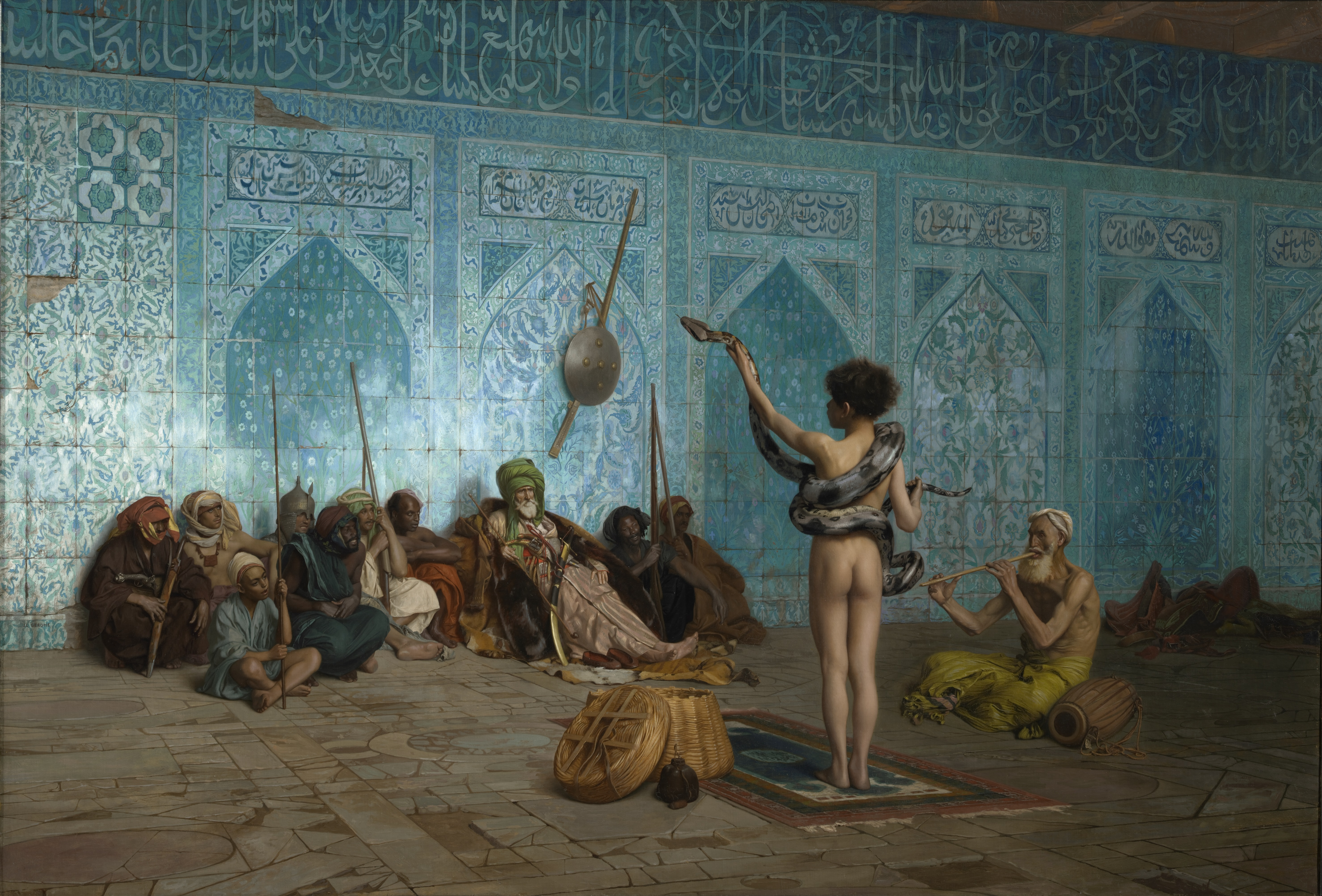
The Snake Charmer, c. 1879, Clark Art Institute

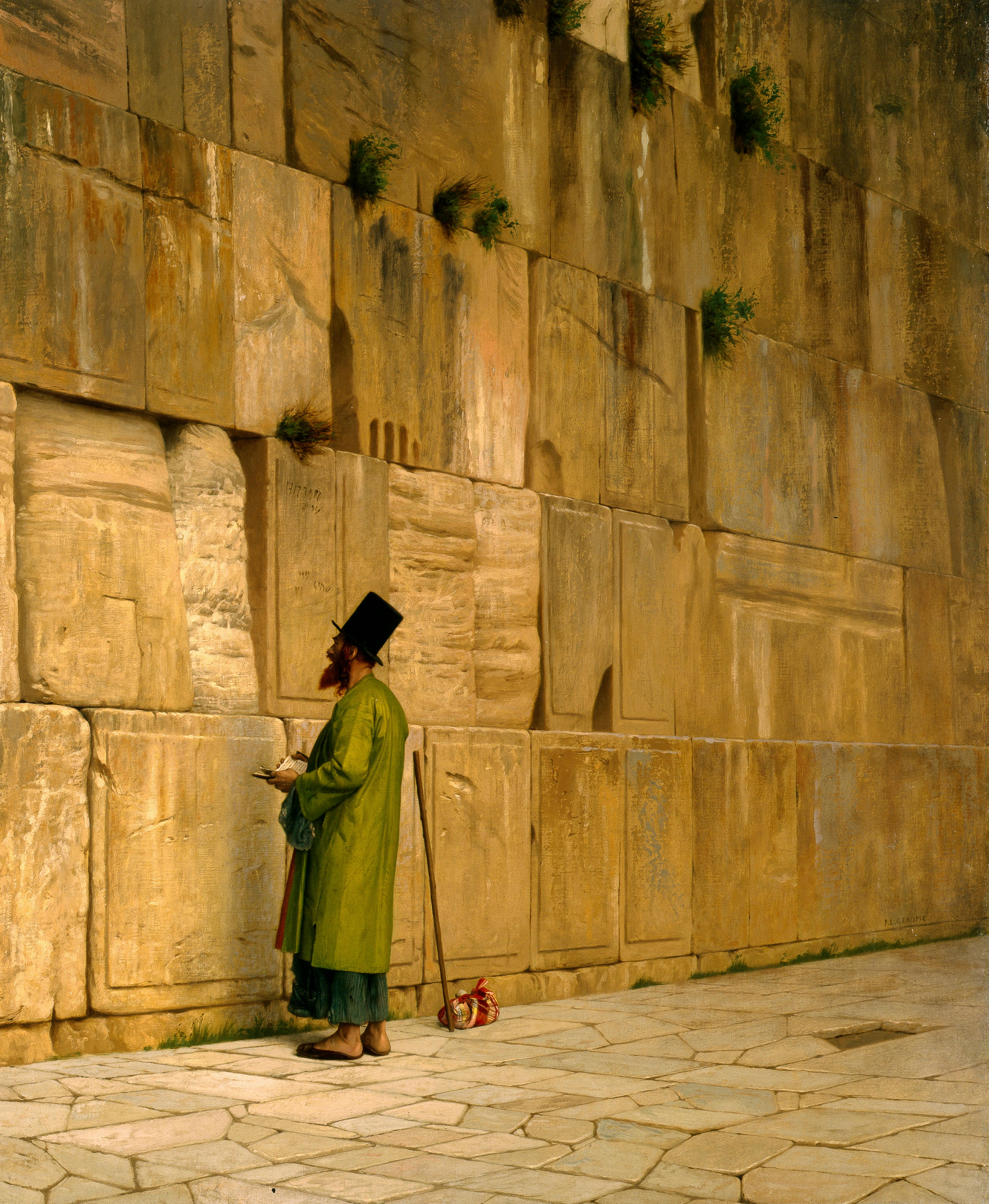
The Wailing Wall, 1880, Israel Museum

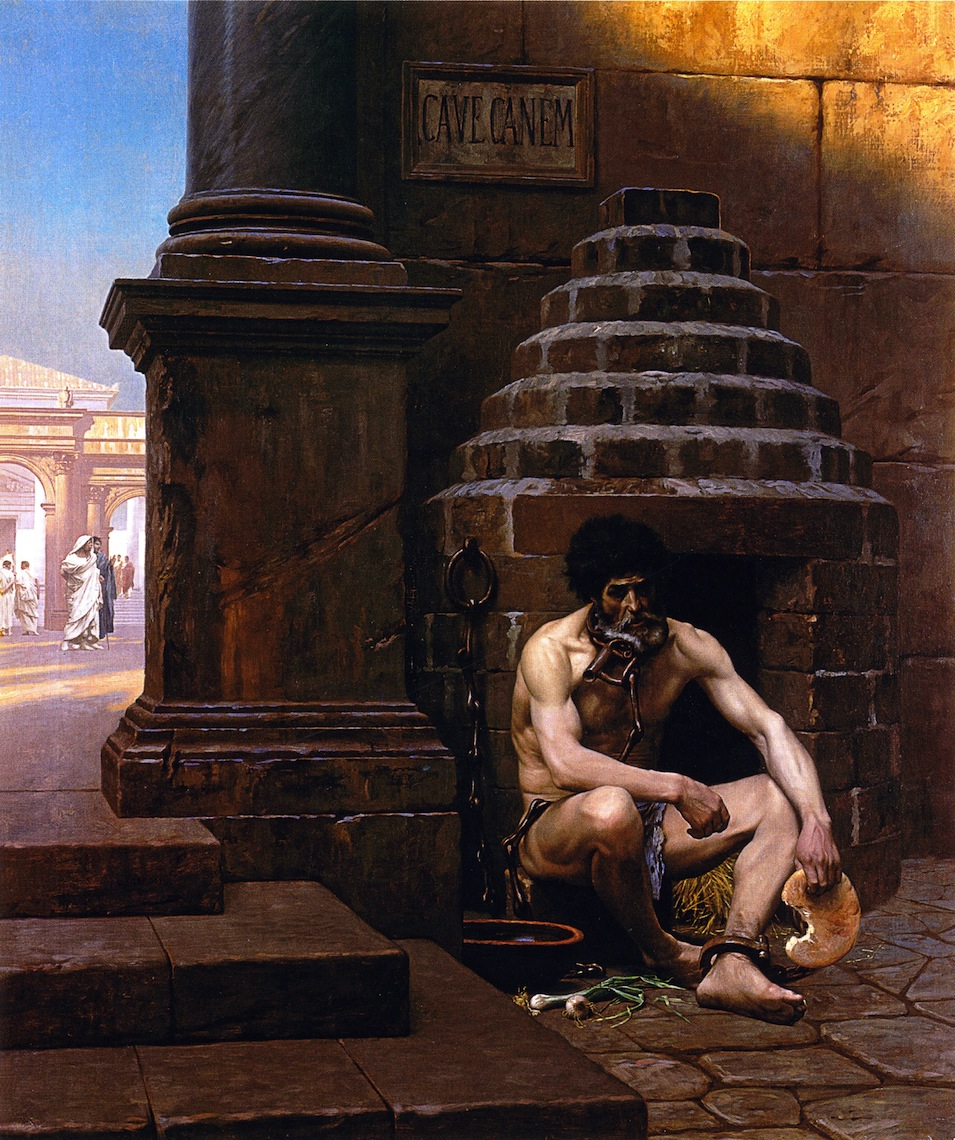
Cave Canem, 1881, Musée Georges-Garret

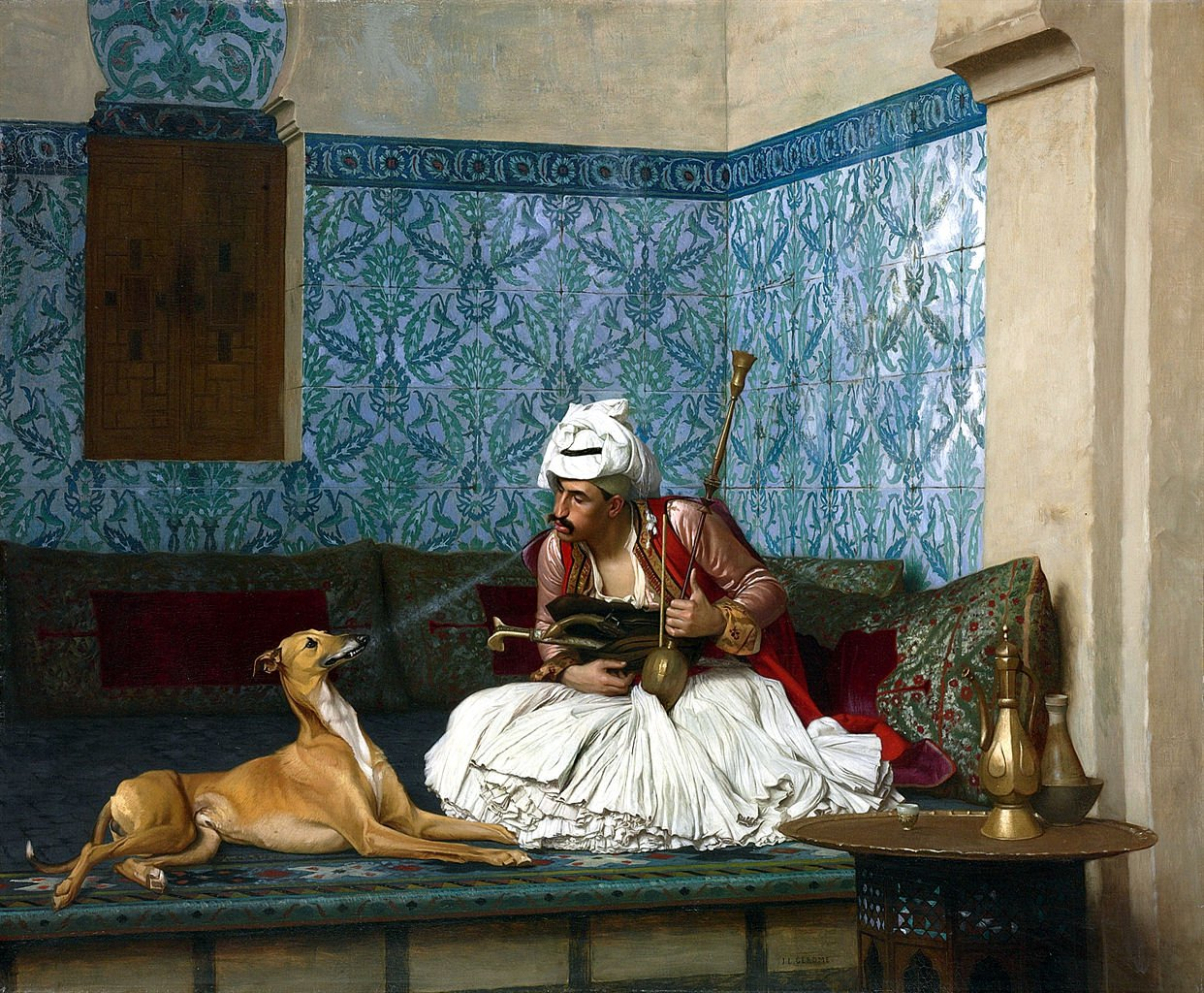
Arnaut Blowing Smoke in His Dog's Nose, 1882, private collection

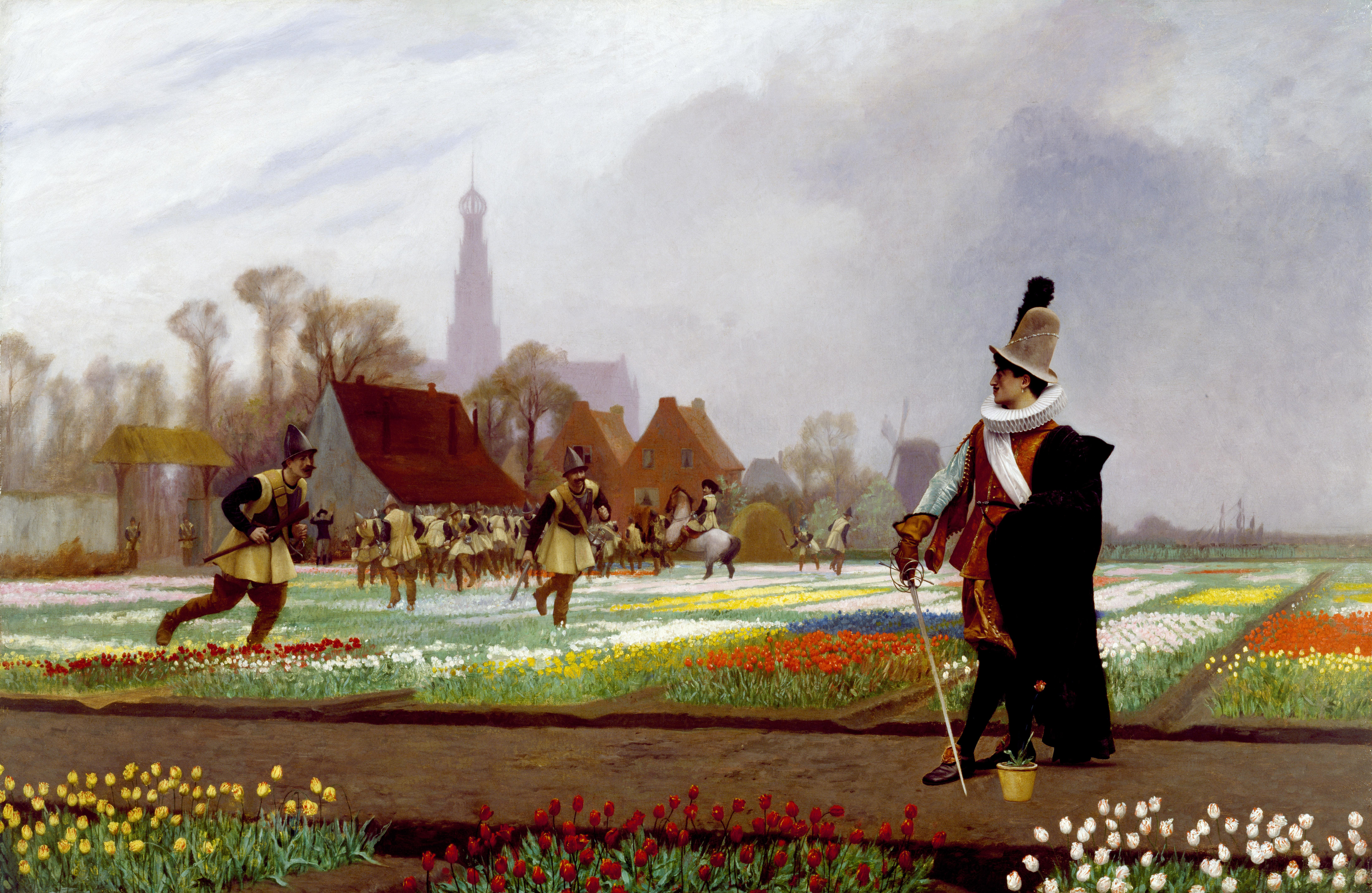
The Tulip Folly, 1882, Walters Art Museum

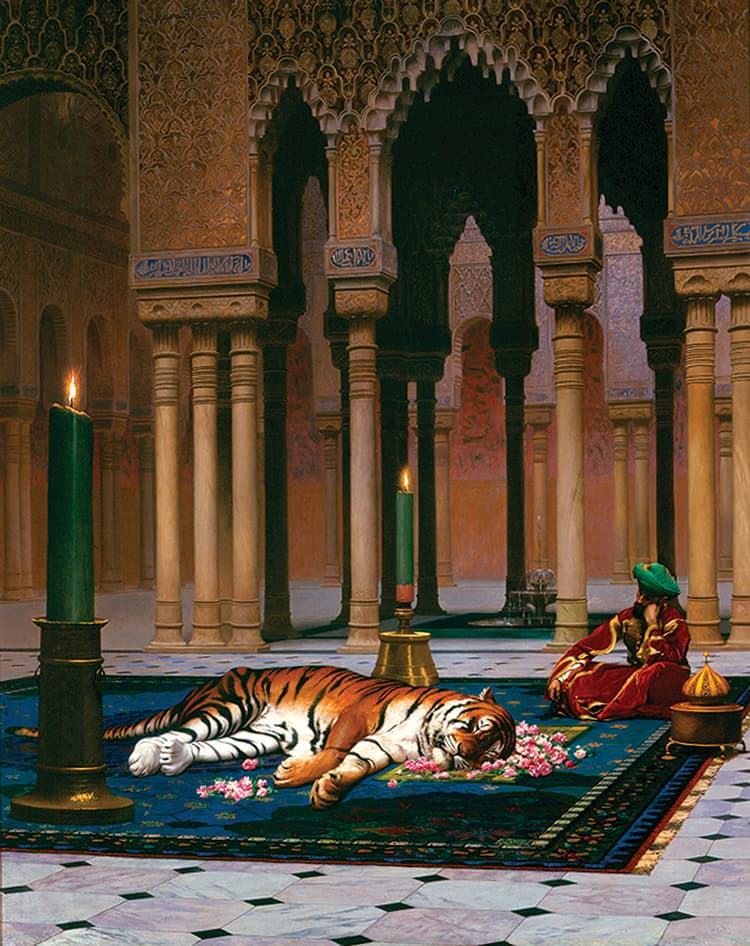
The Grief of the Pasha, 1882, Joslyn Art Museum

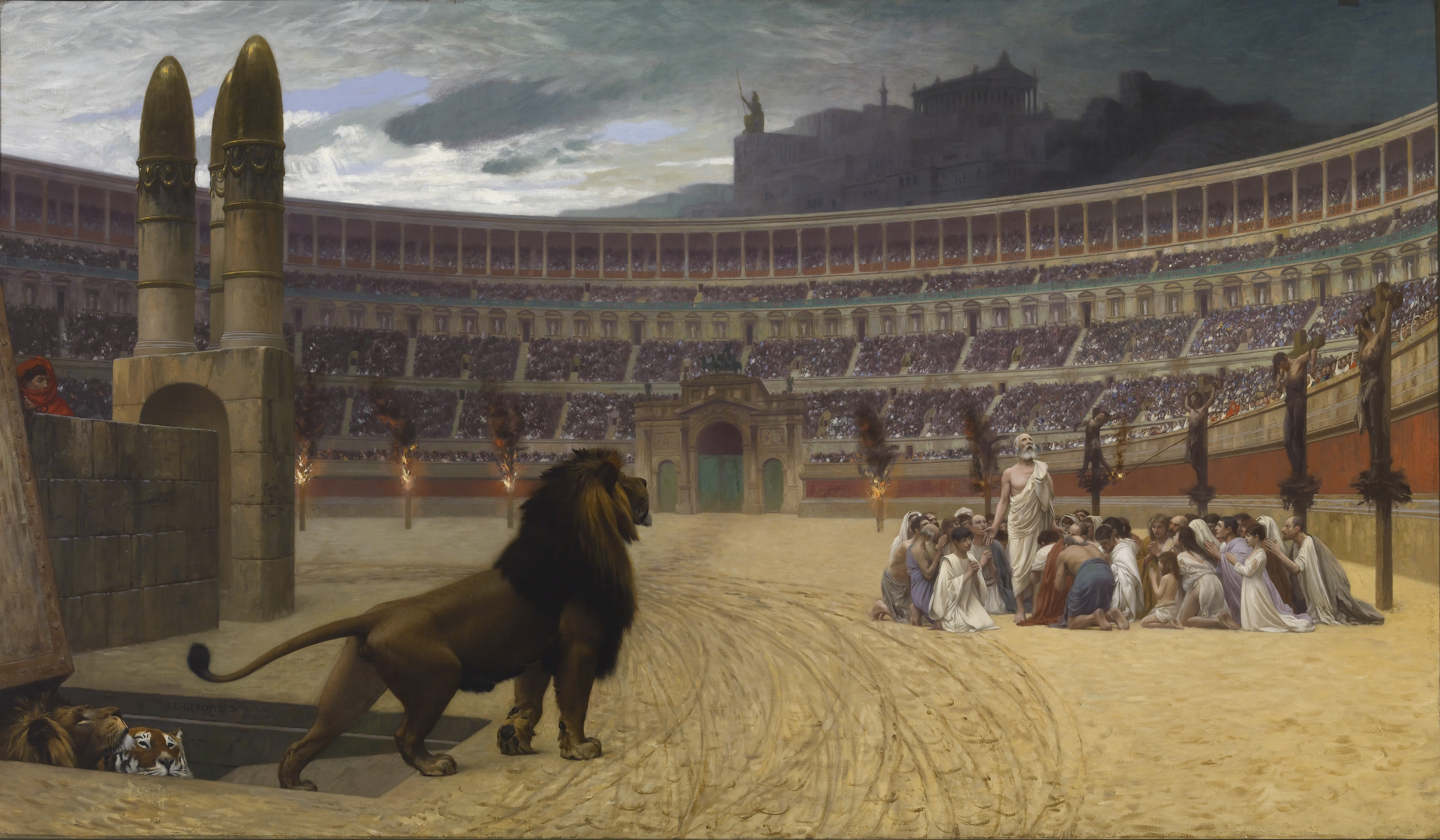
The Christian Martyrs' Last Prayer, 1883, Walters Art Museum

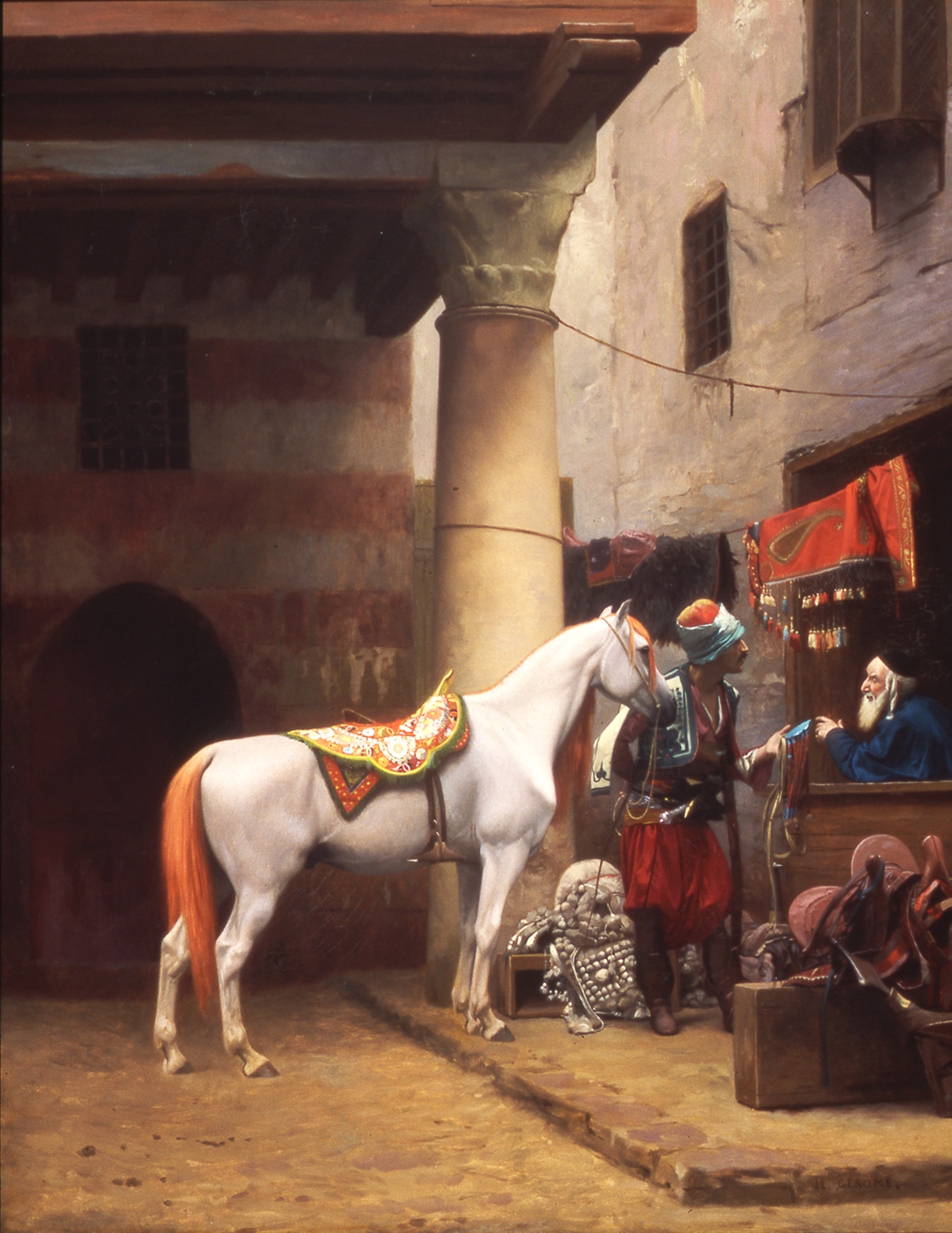
The Saddle Bazaar, Cairo, 1883, Haggin Museum

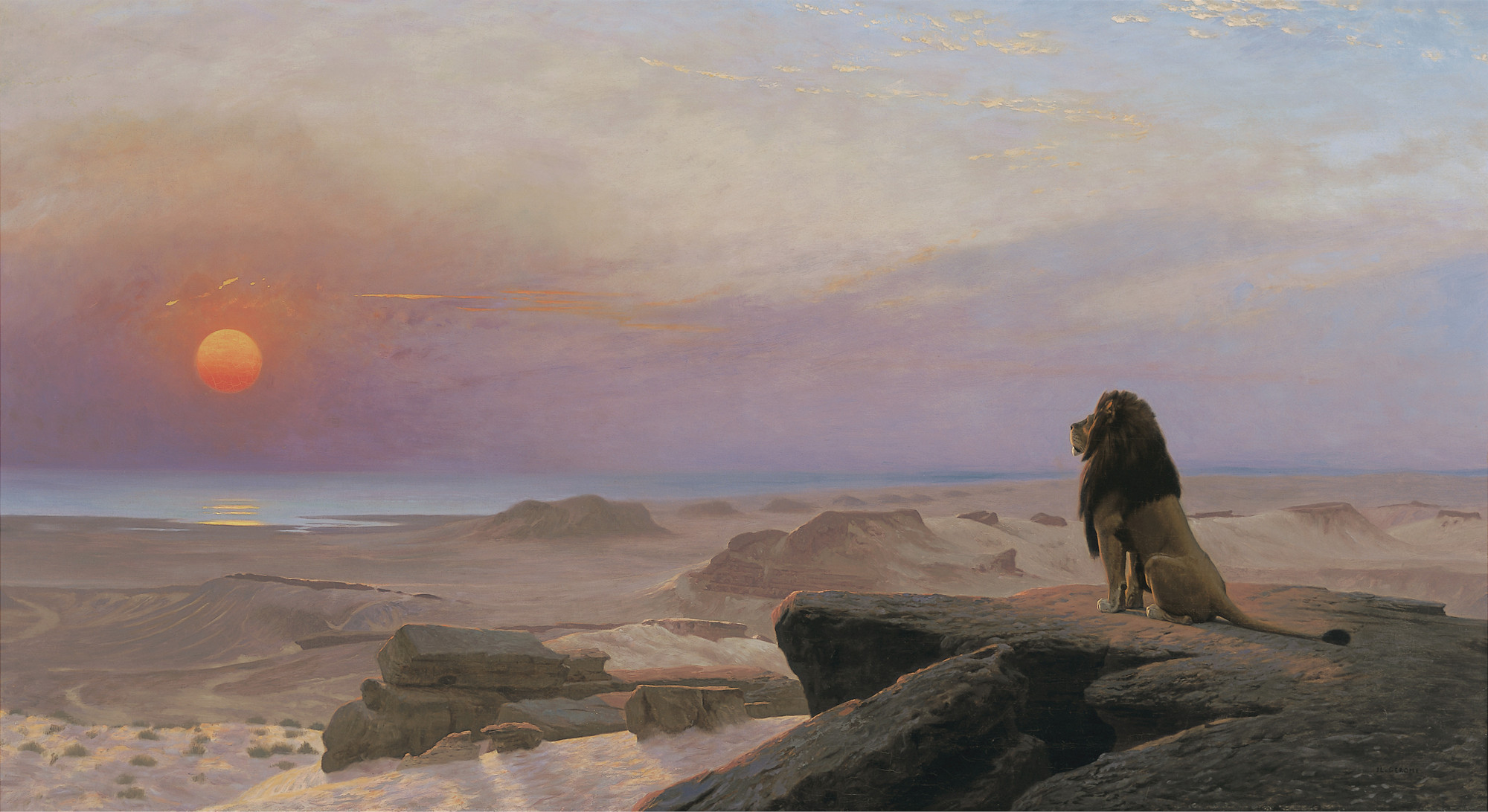
The Two Majesties, 1883, Milwaukee Art Museum

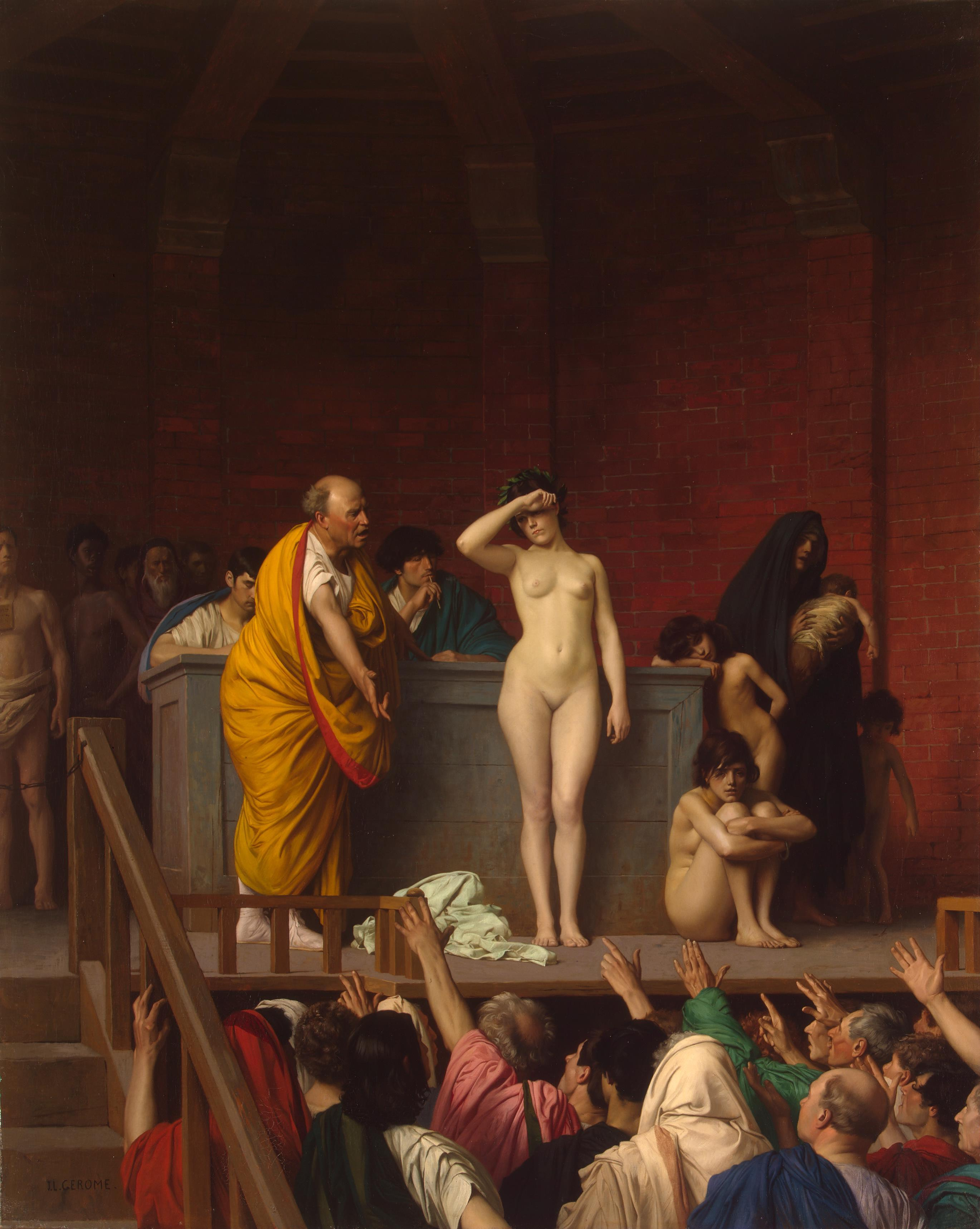
Slave Market in Ancient Rome, c. 1884, Hermitage Museum

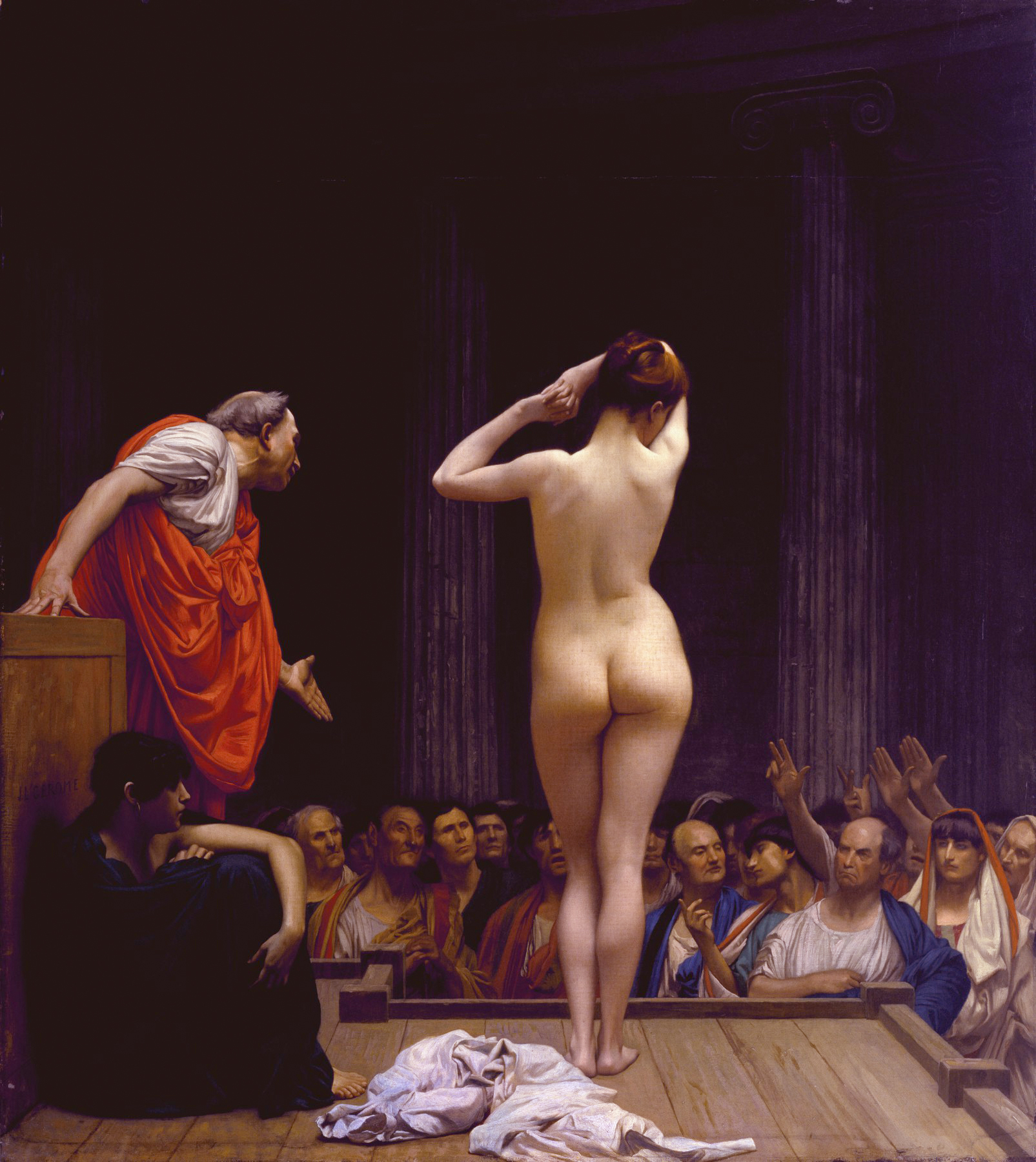
A Roman Slave Market, c. 1884, Walters Art Museum

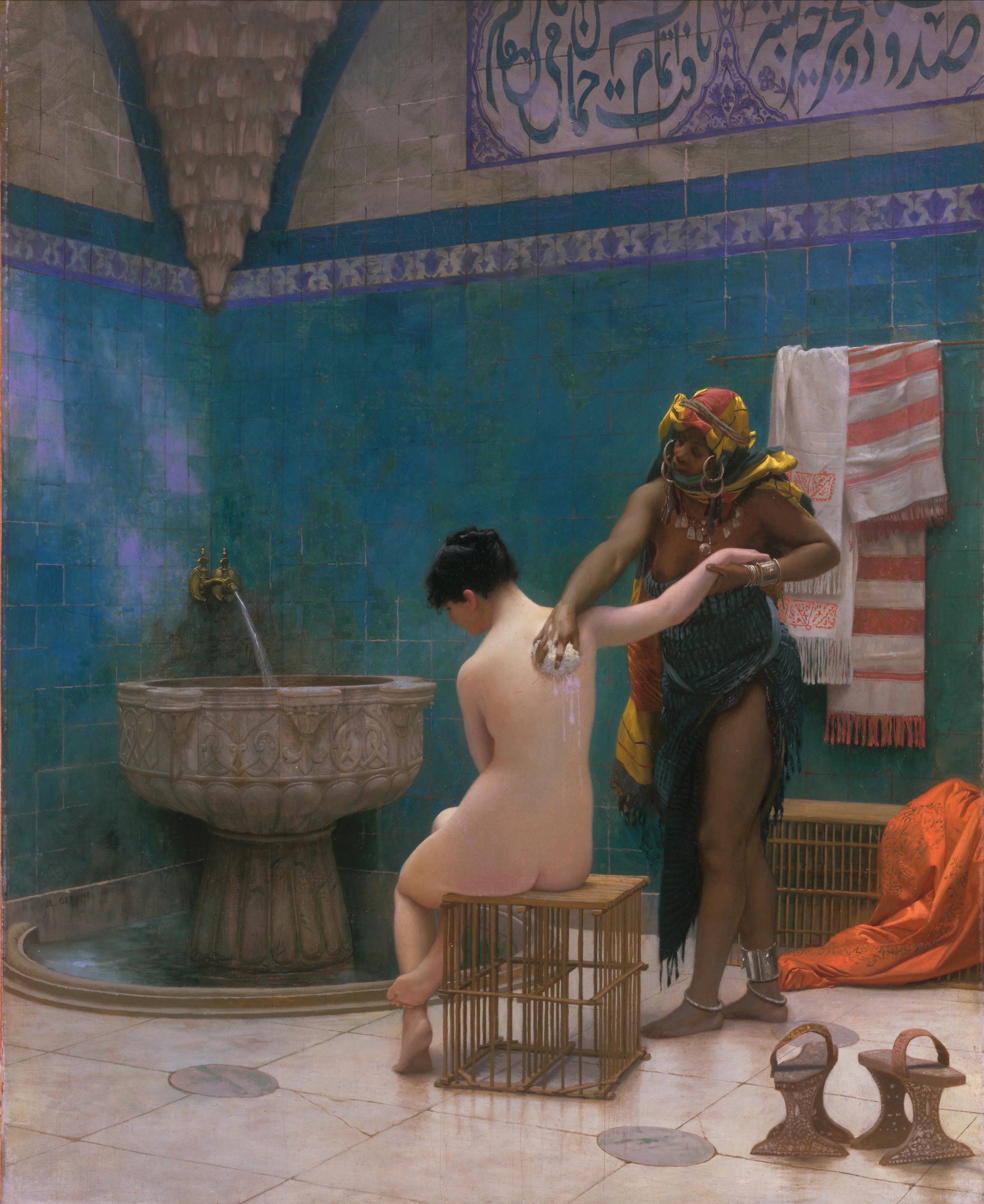
The Bath, 1880–1885, Legion of Honor, San Francisco

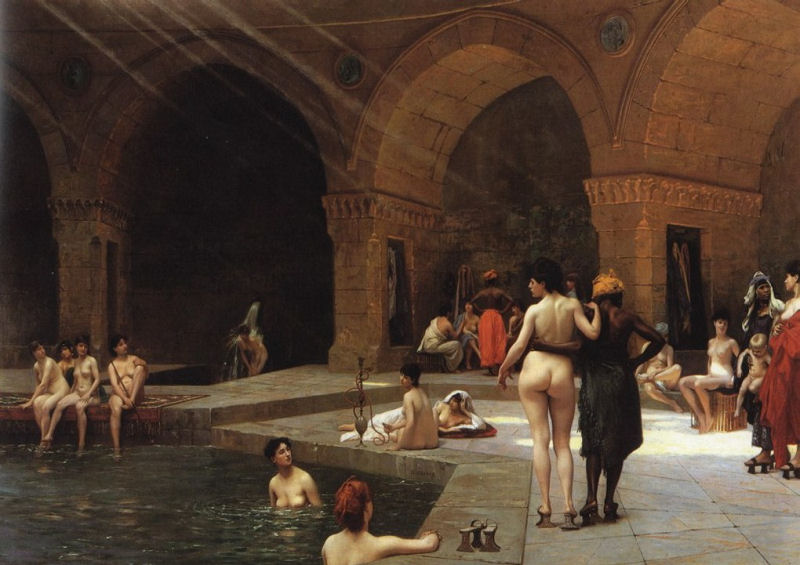
The Great Bath at Bursa, 1885, private collection

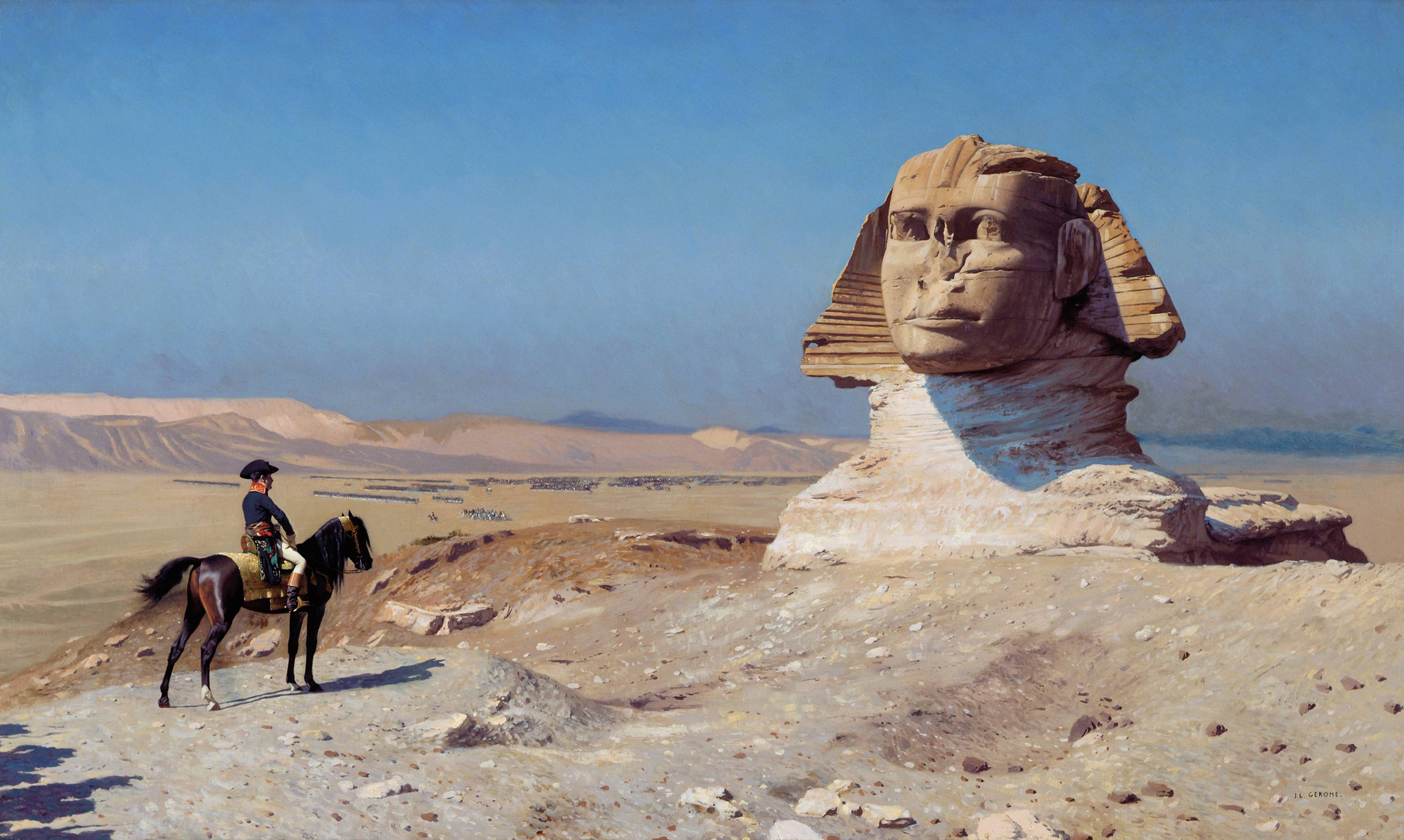
Bonaparte Before the Sphinx, aka Œdipe, 1886, Hearst Castle

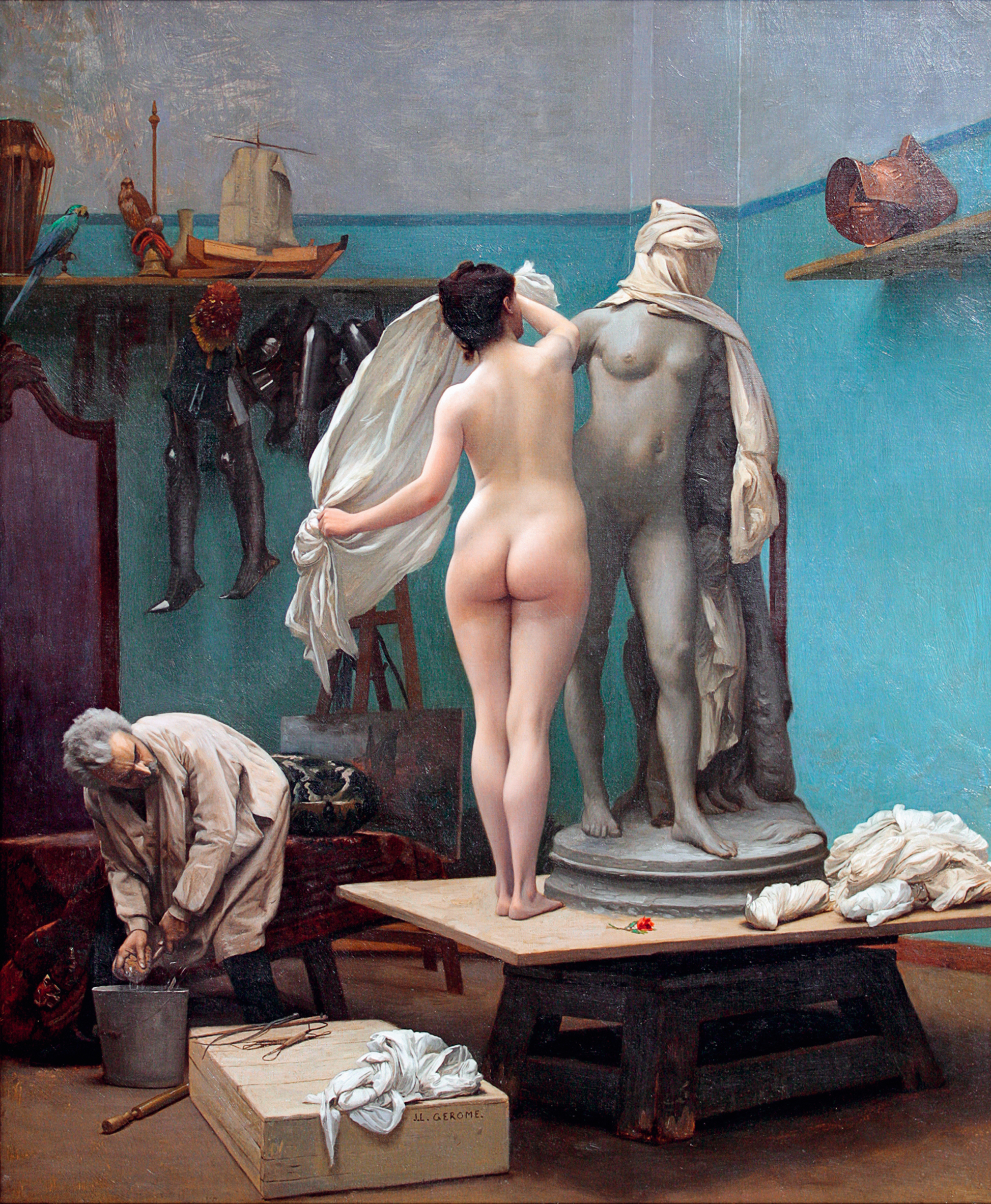
The End of the Session, 1886, private collection

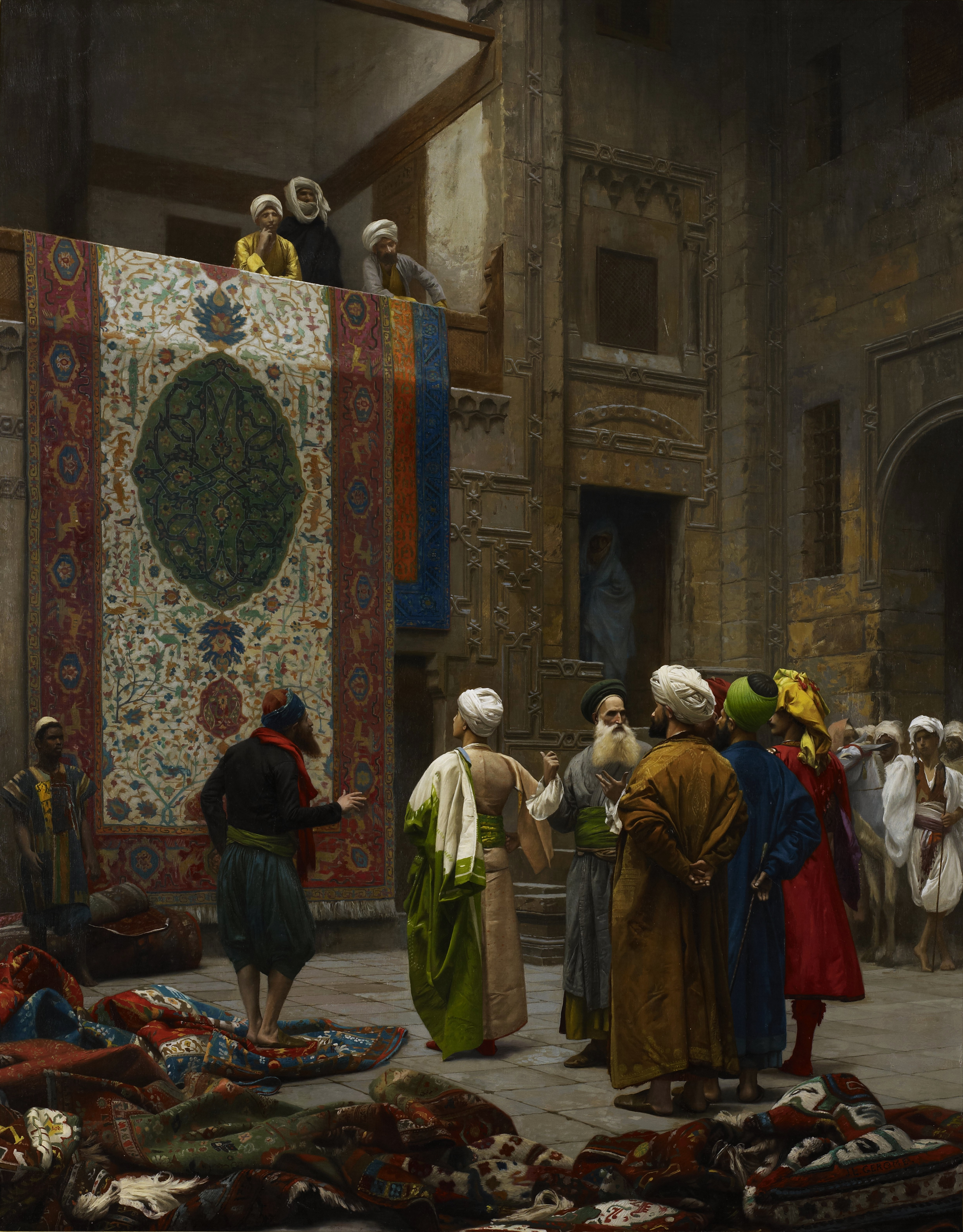
The Carpet Merchant, c. 1887, Minneapolis Institute of Art

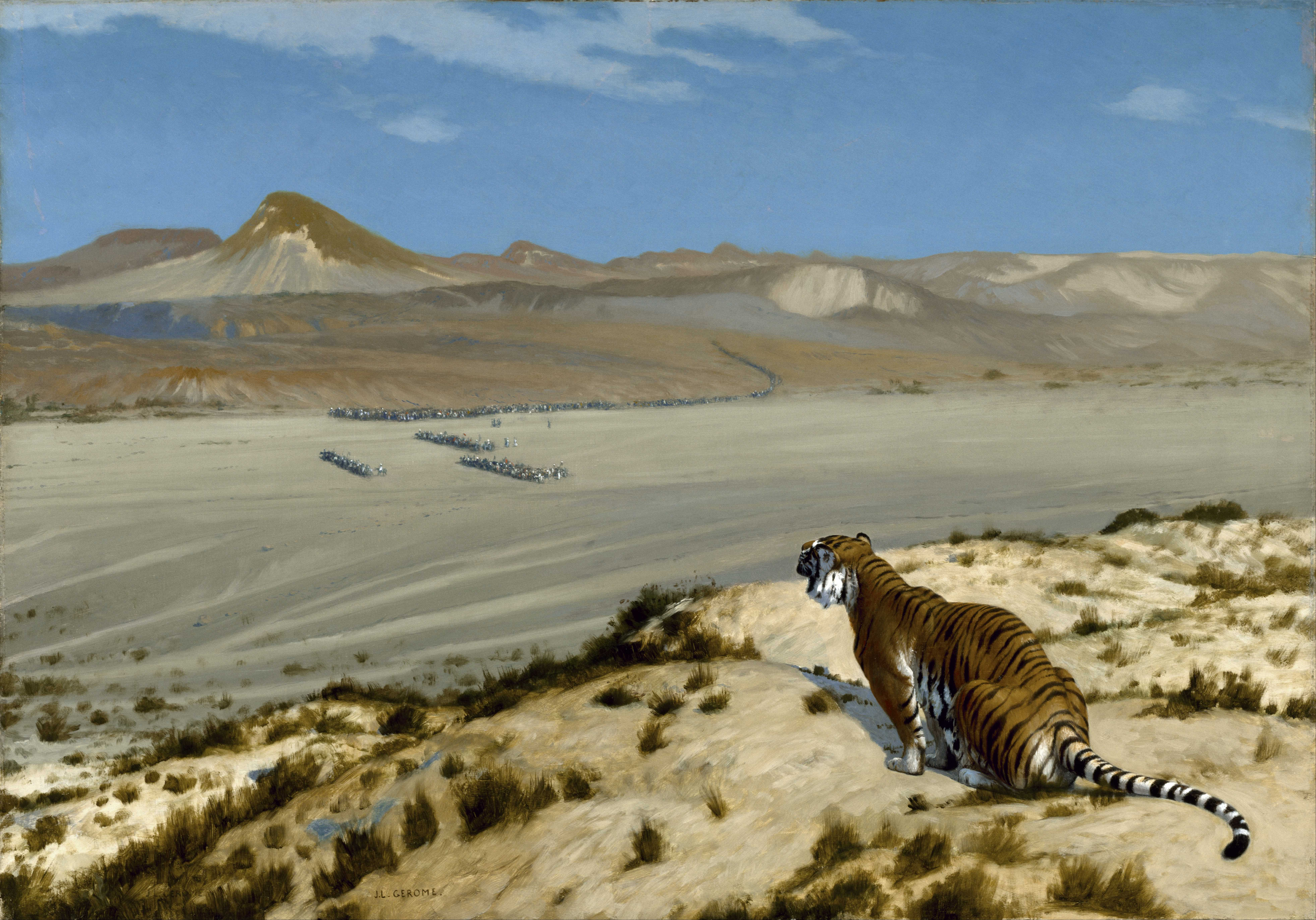
Tiger on the Watch, c. 1888, Museum of Fine Arts, Houston

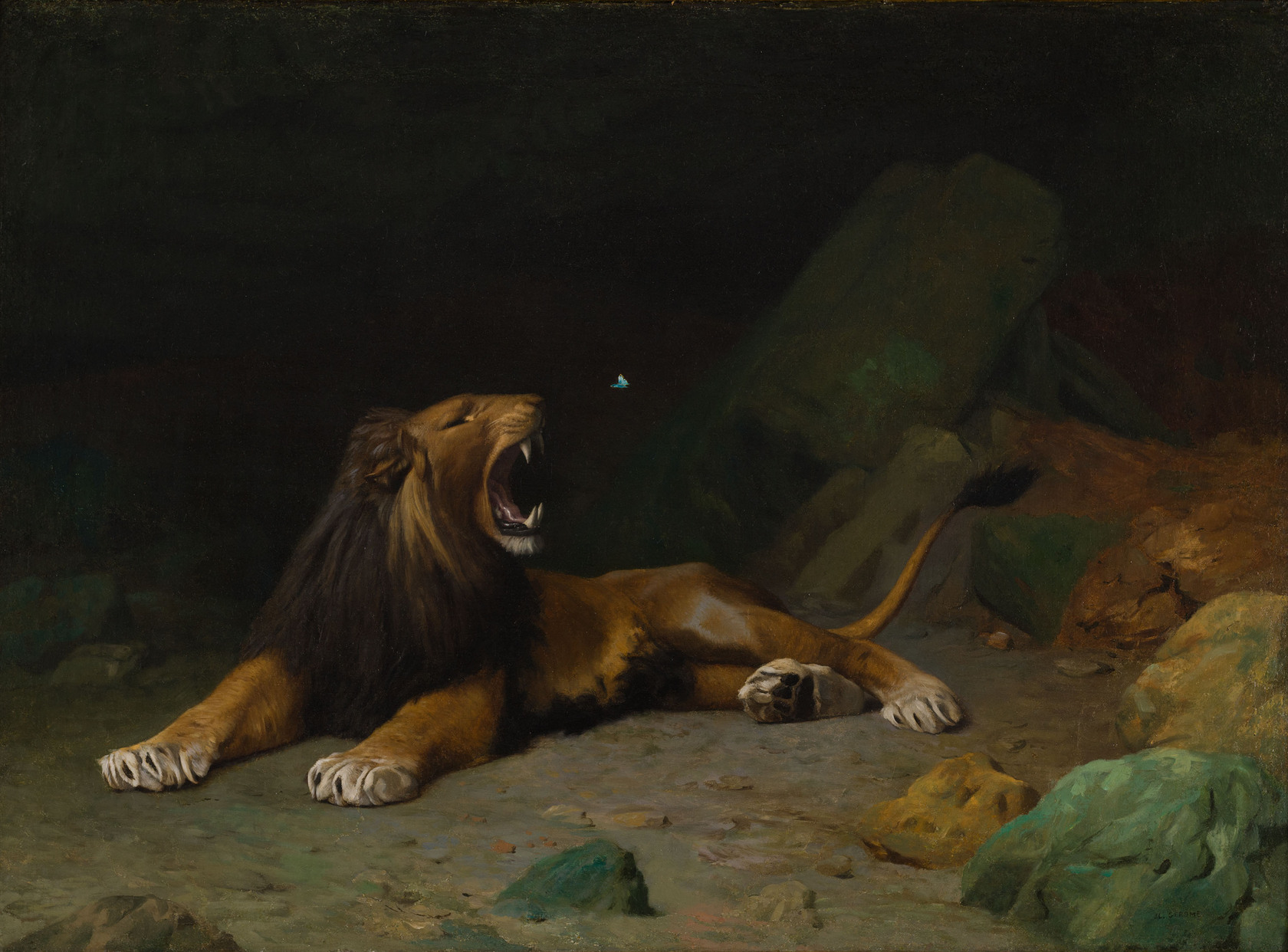
Lion Snapping at a Butterfly, 1889, Carnegie Museum of Art

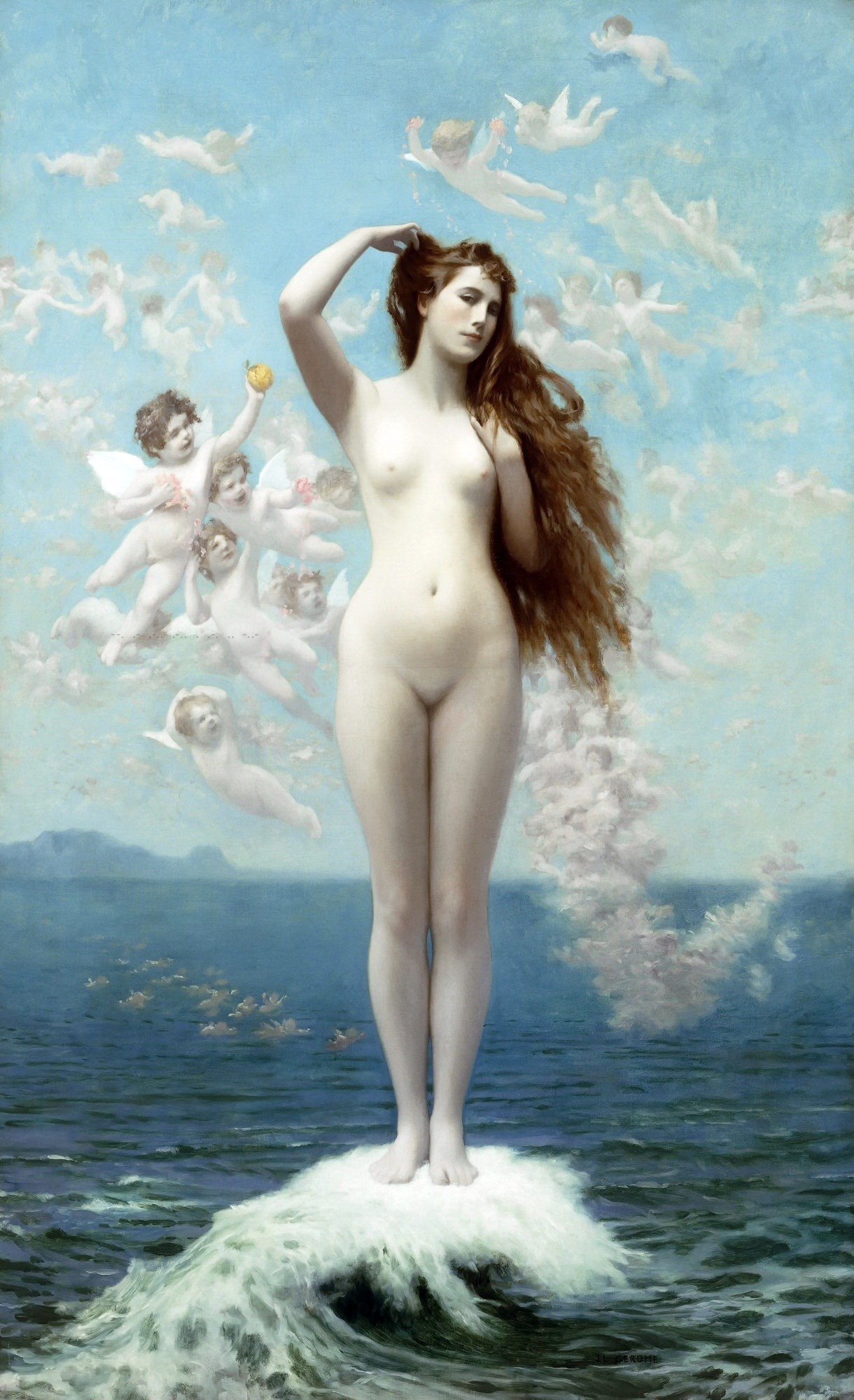
The Birth of Venus, 1890, private collection

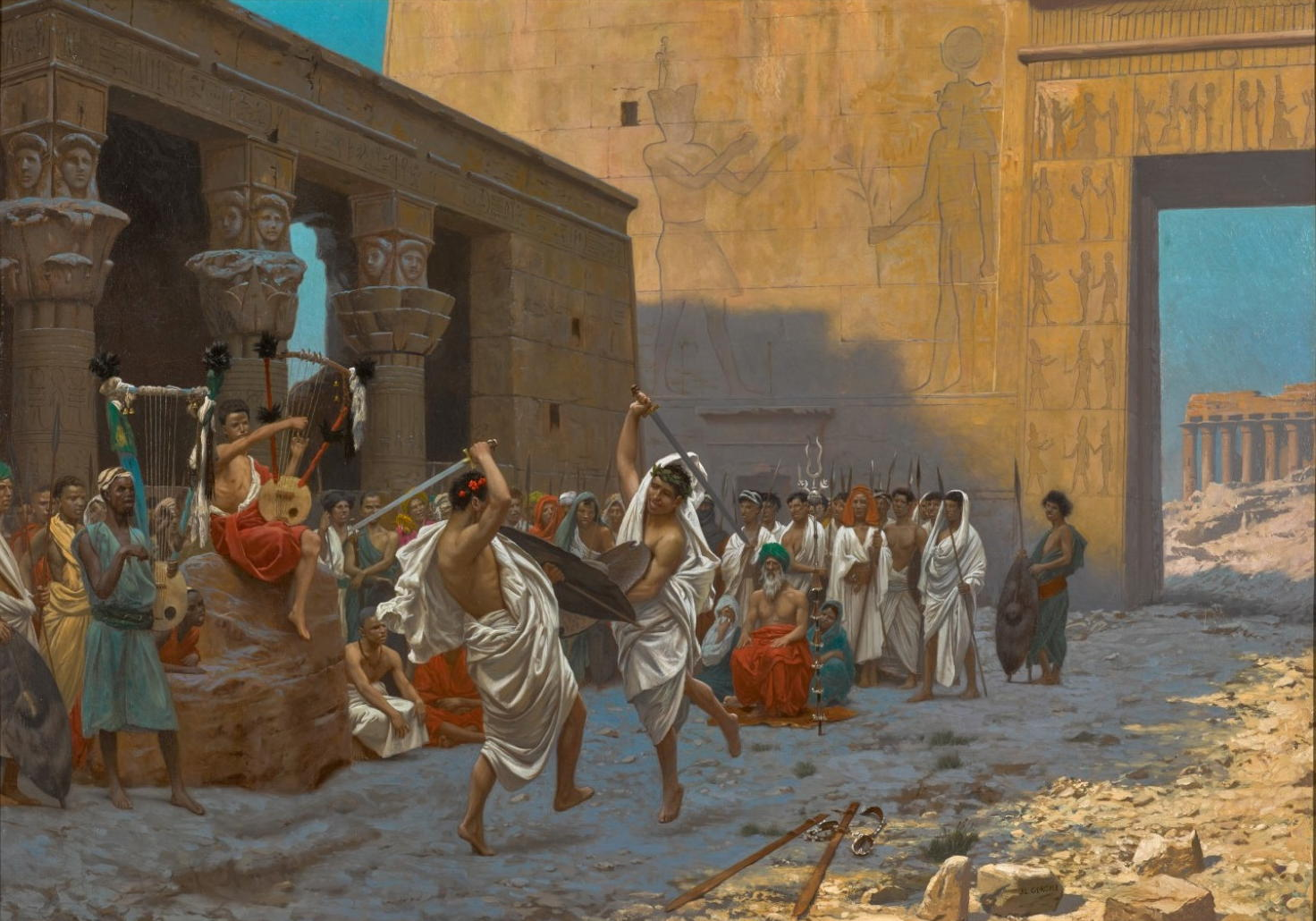
La Danse Pyrrhique, c. 1890, private collection

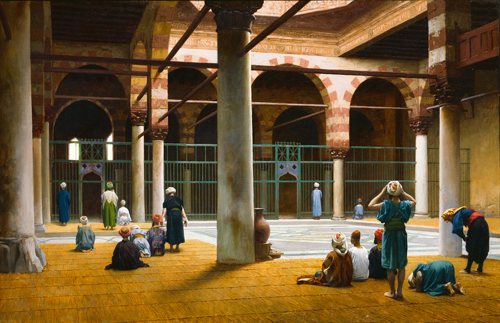
Interior of a Mosque, c. 1890, Memorial Art Gallery, Rochester, NY

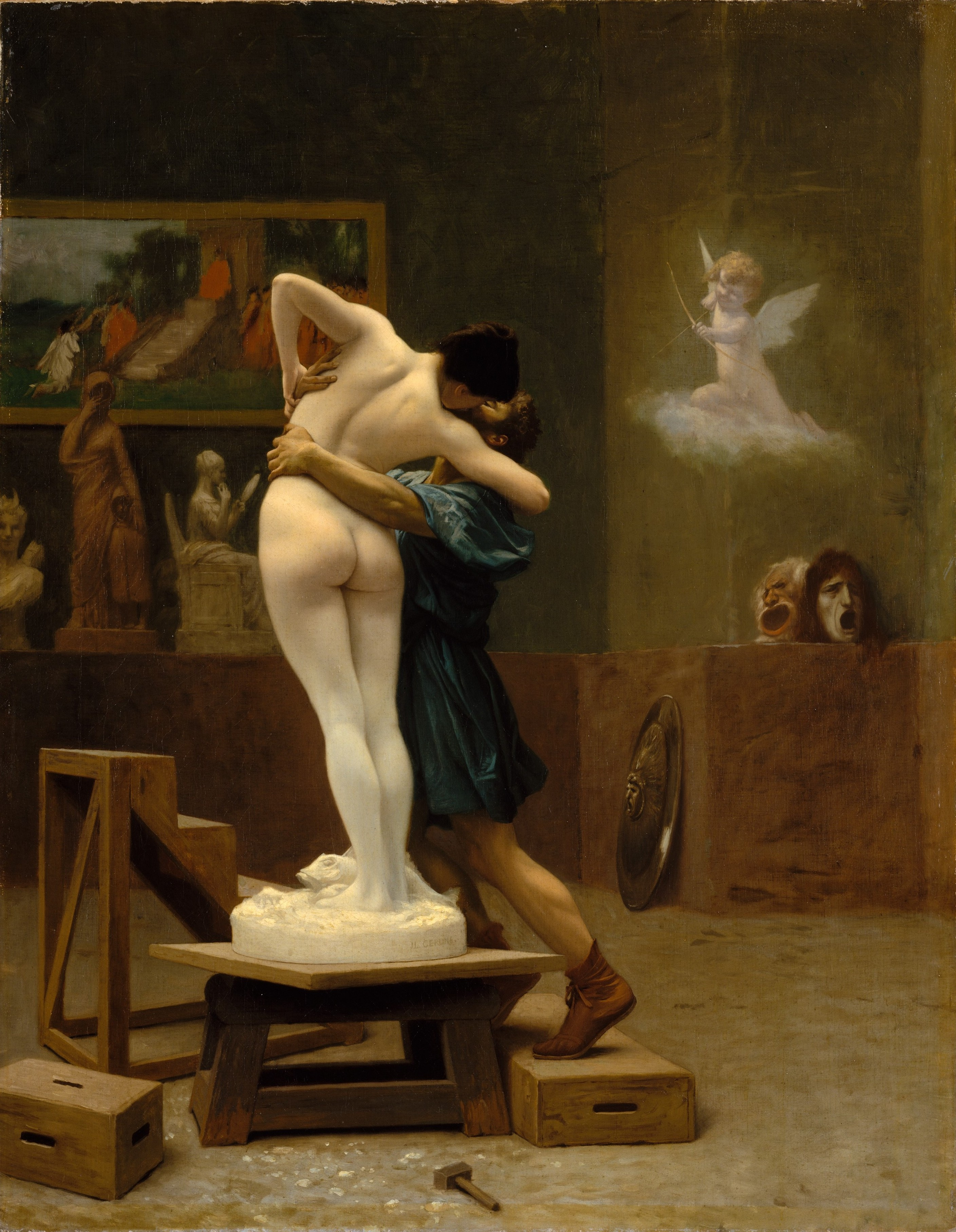
Pygmalion and Galatea, 1890, Metropolitan Museum of Art

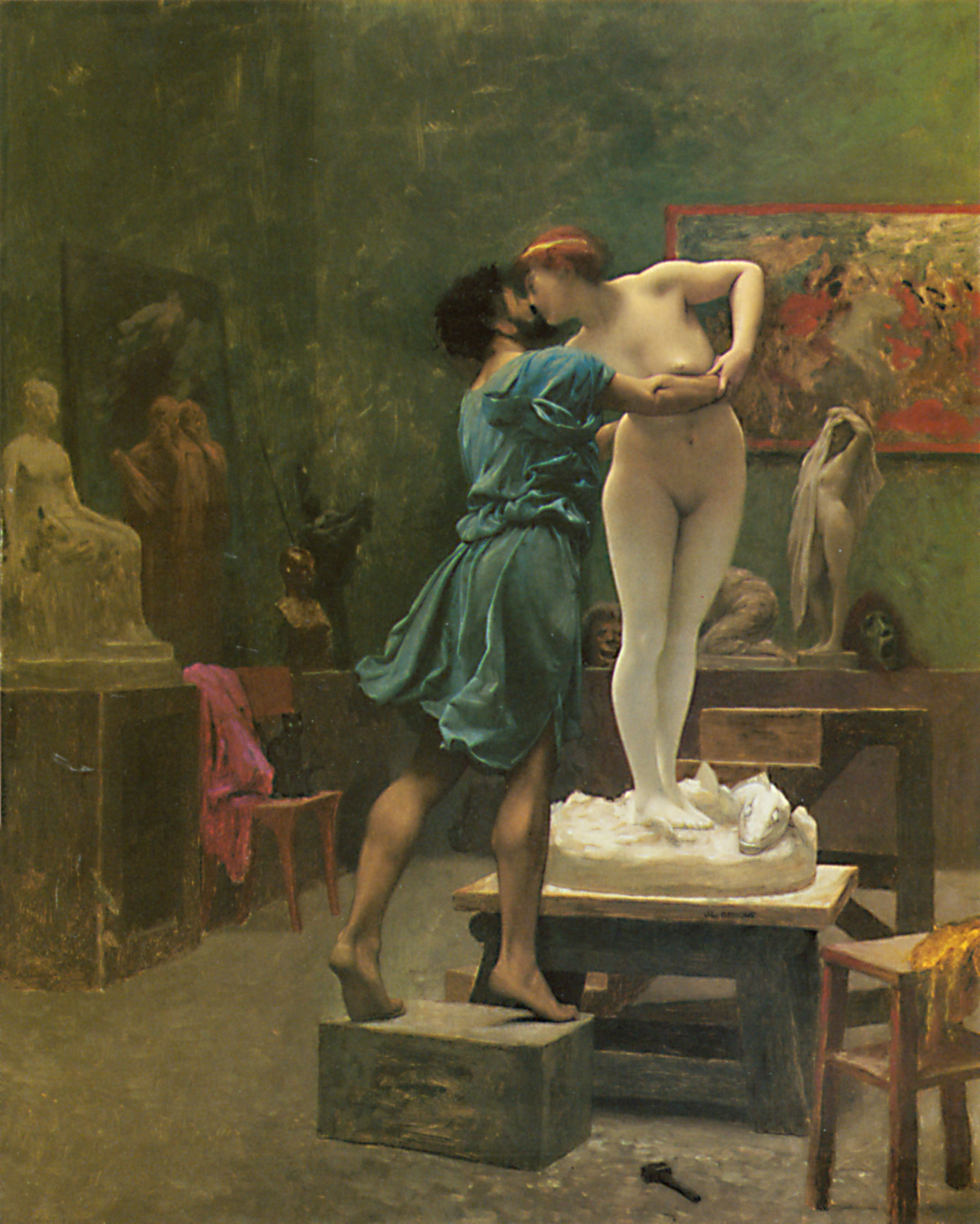
Pygmalion and Galatea, c. 1890

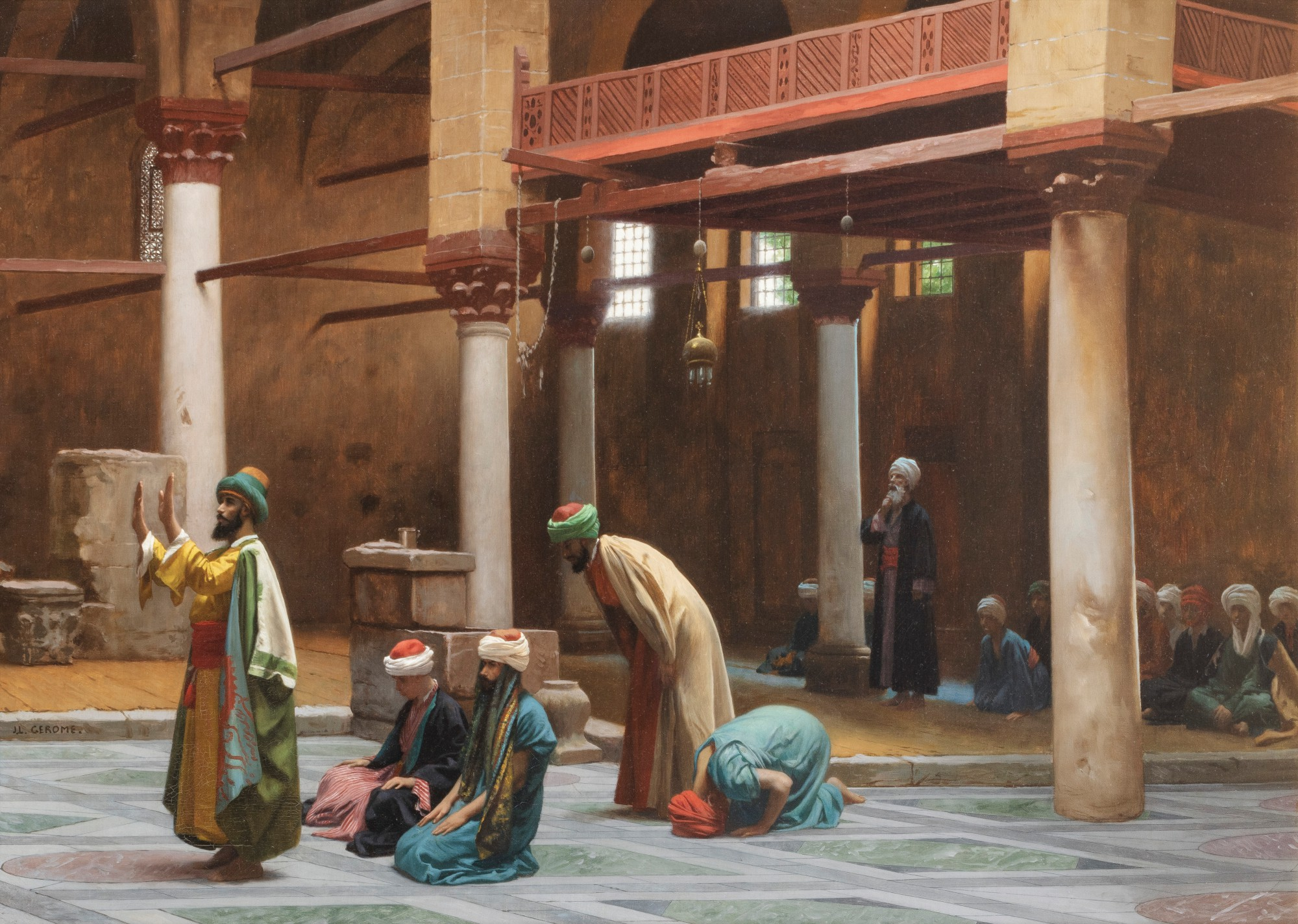
Prayers in the Mosque, 1892, private collection

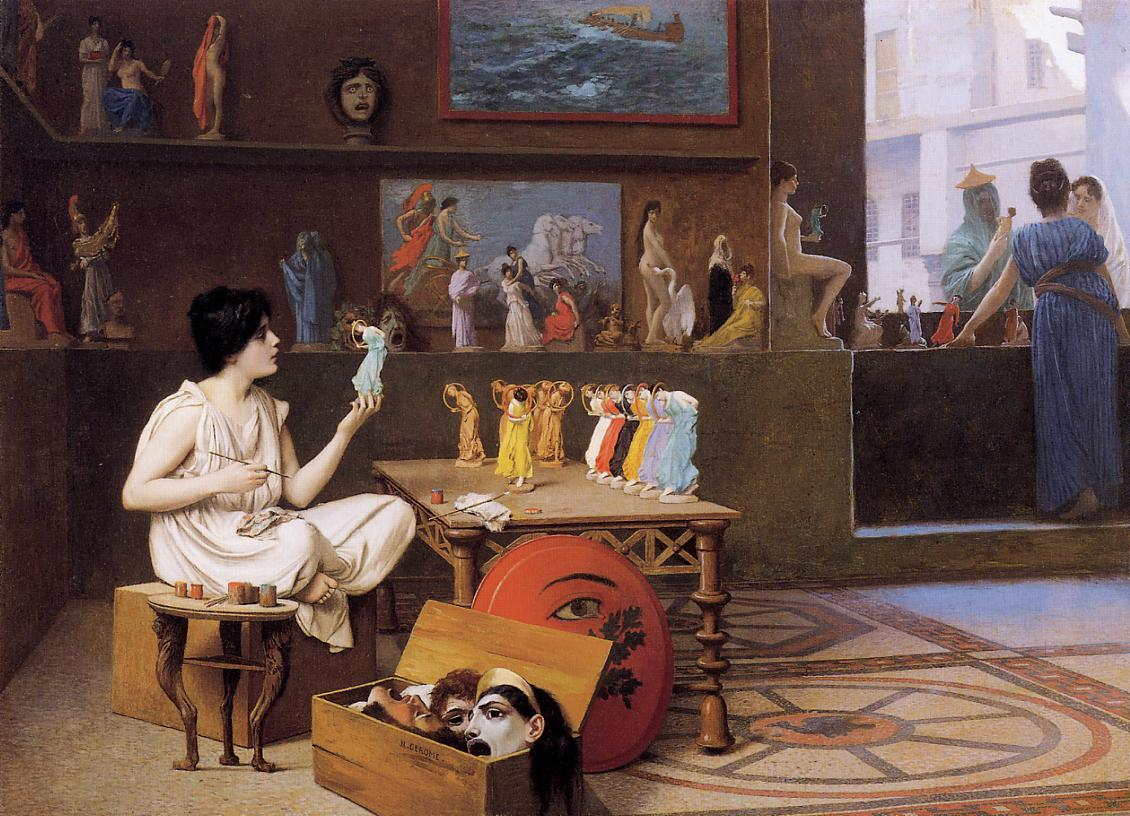
The Antique Pottery Painter: Sculpturæ vitam insufflat pictura (painting breathes life into sculpture), 1893, Art Gallery of Ontario

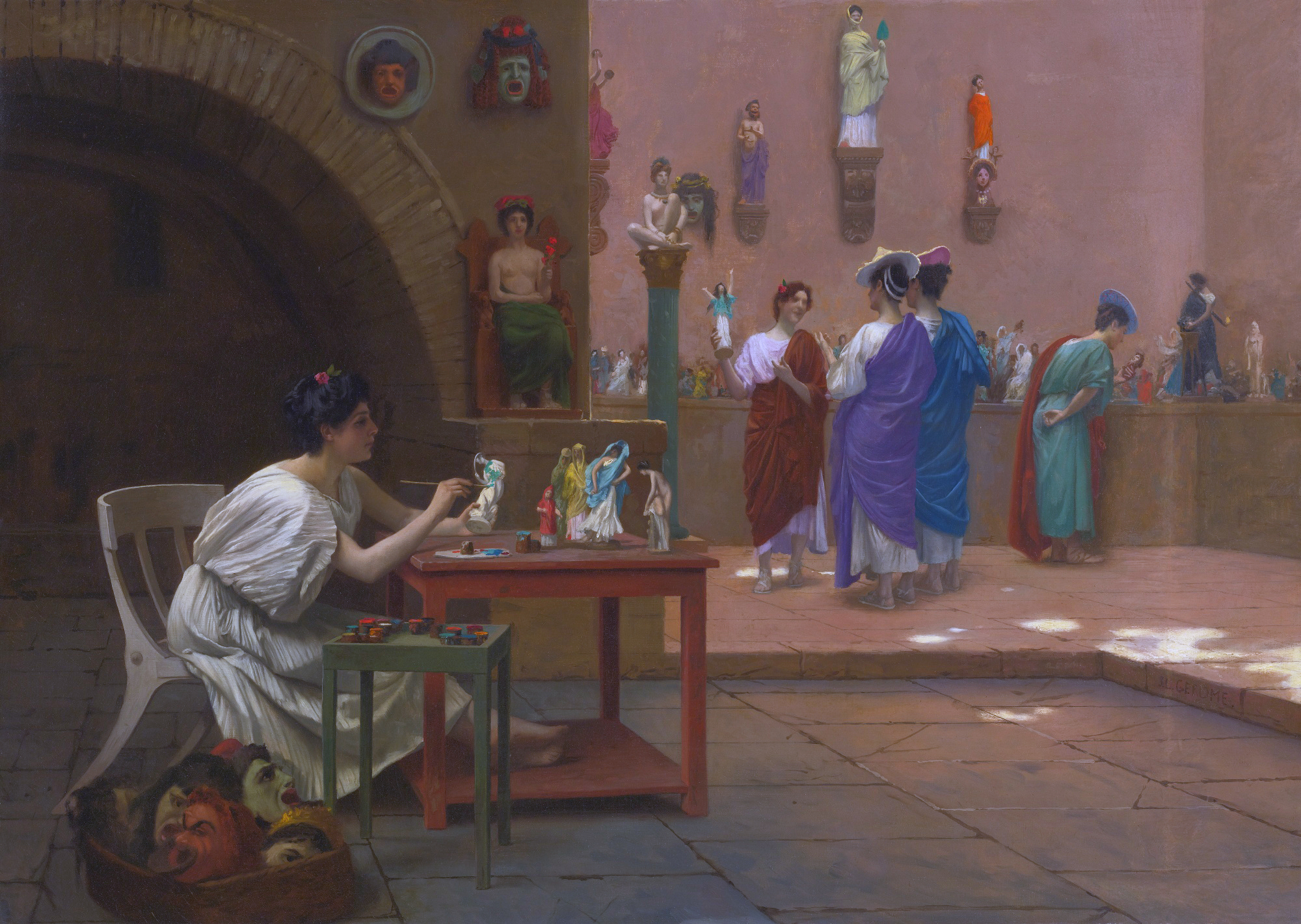
Tanagra Workshop, 1893, private collection

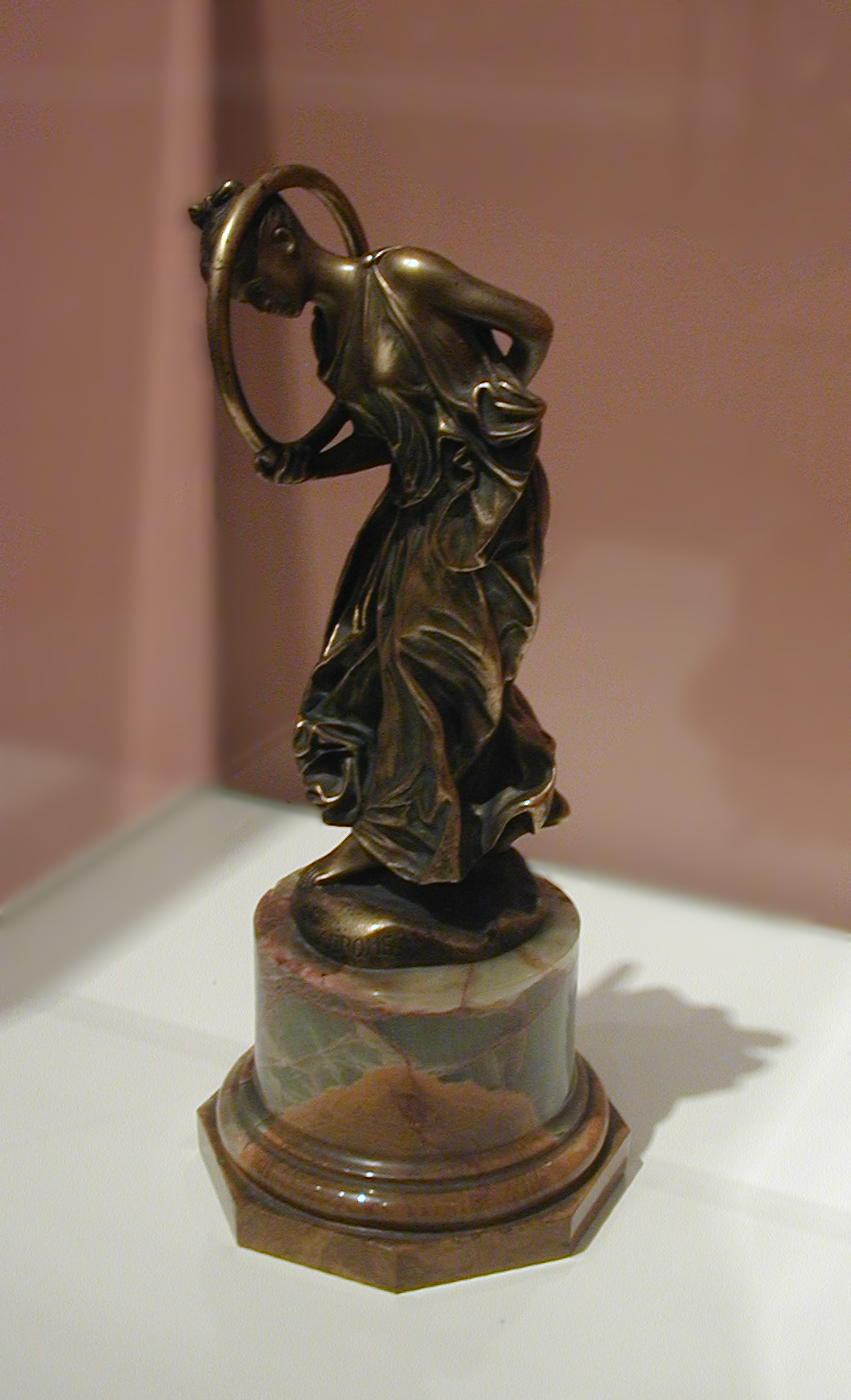
Hoop Dancer, c. 1890, Haggin Museum, seen in his painting The Artist and His Model

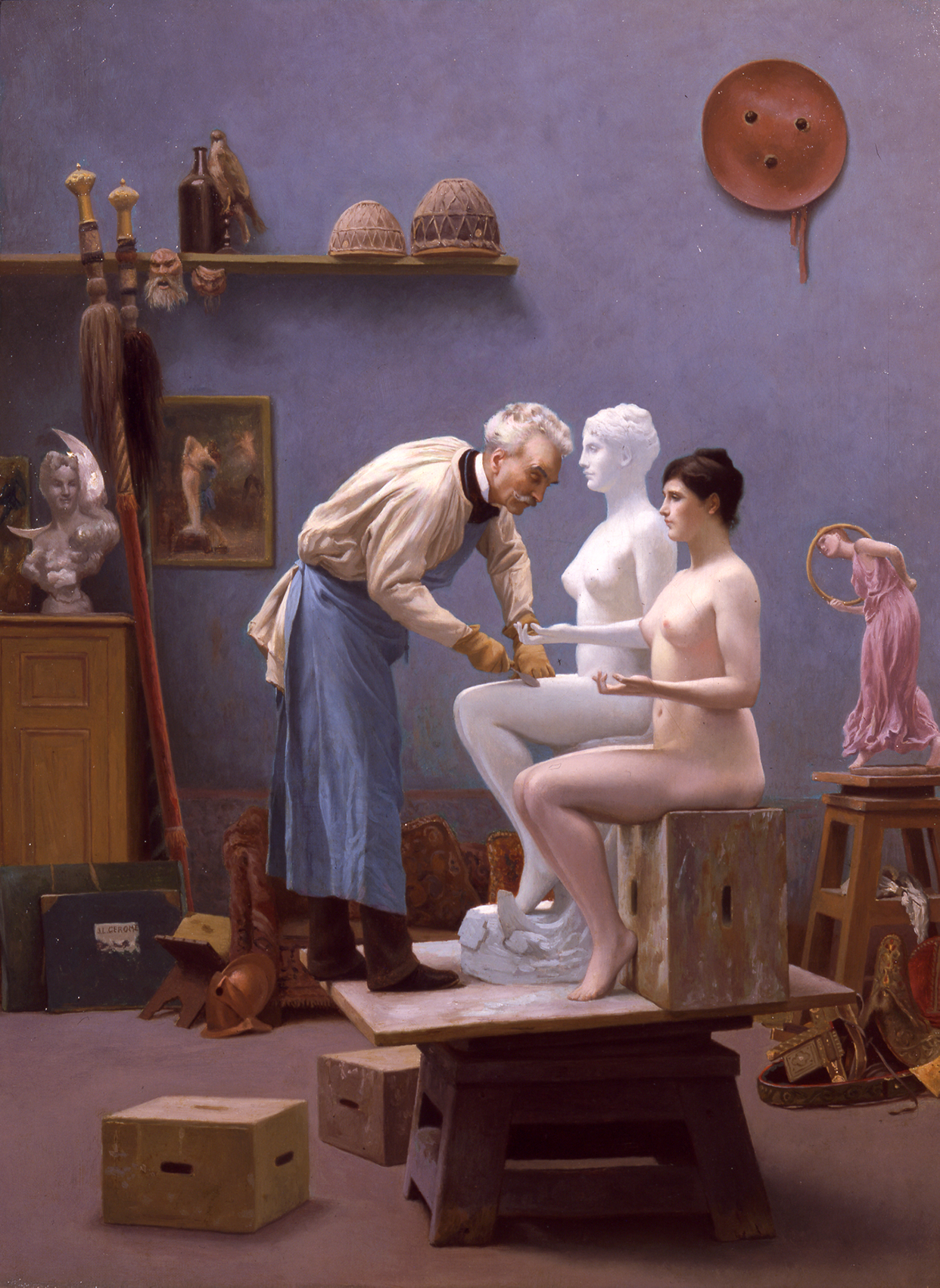
The Artist and His Model, 1895, Haggin Museum; Gérôme depicts himself sculpting Tanagra

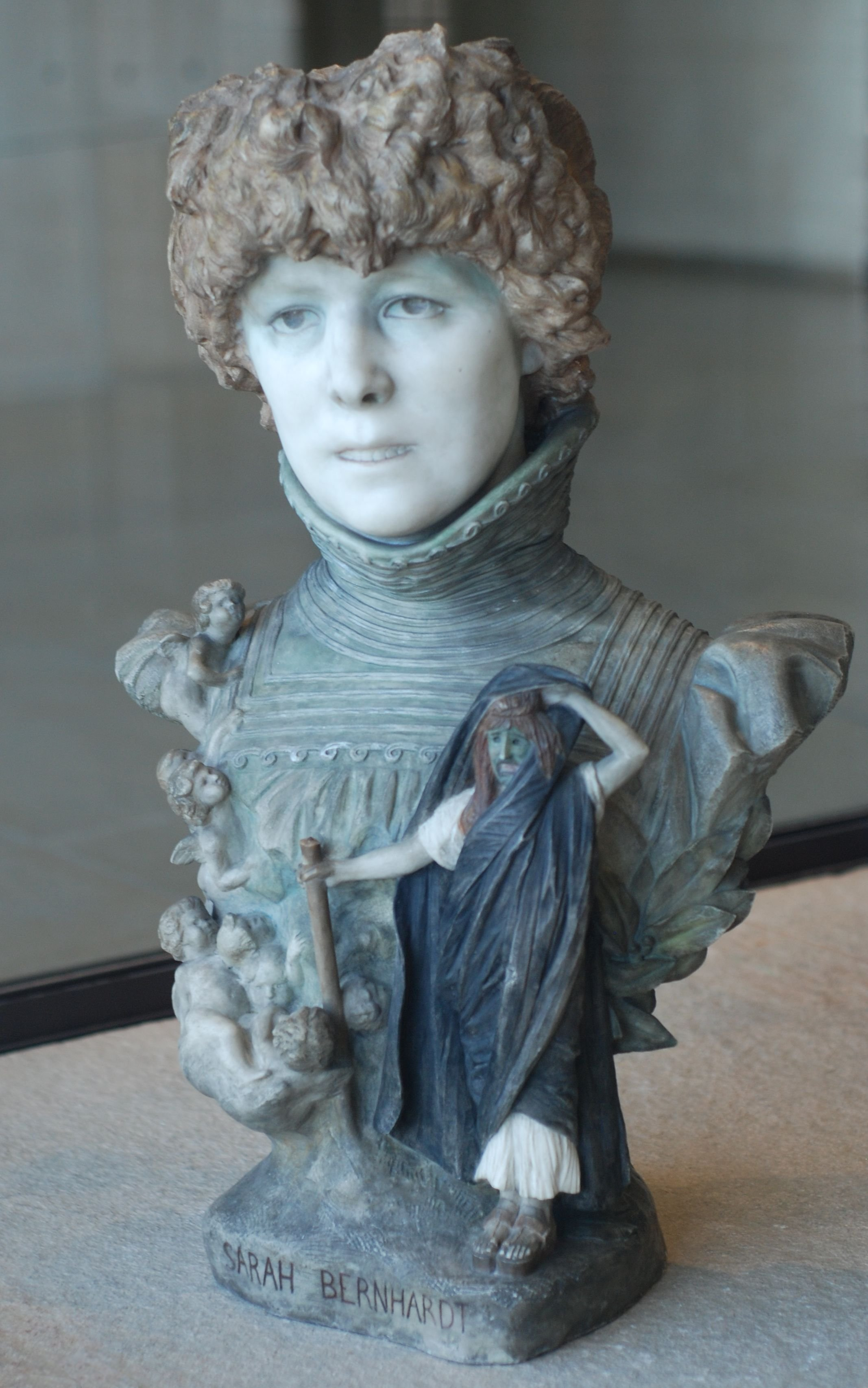
Sarah Bernhardt, marble, c. 1895, Musée d'Orsay

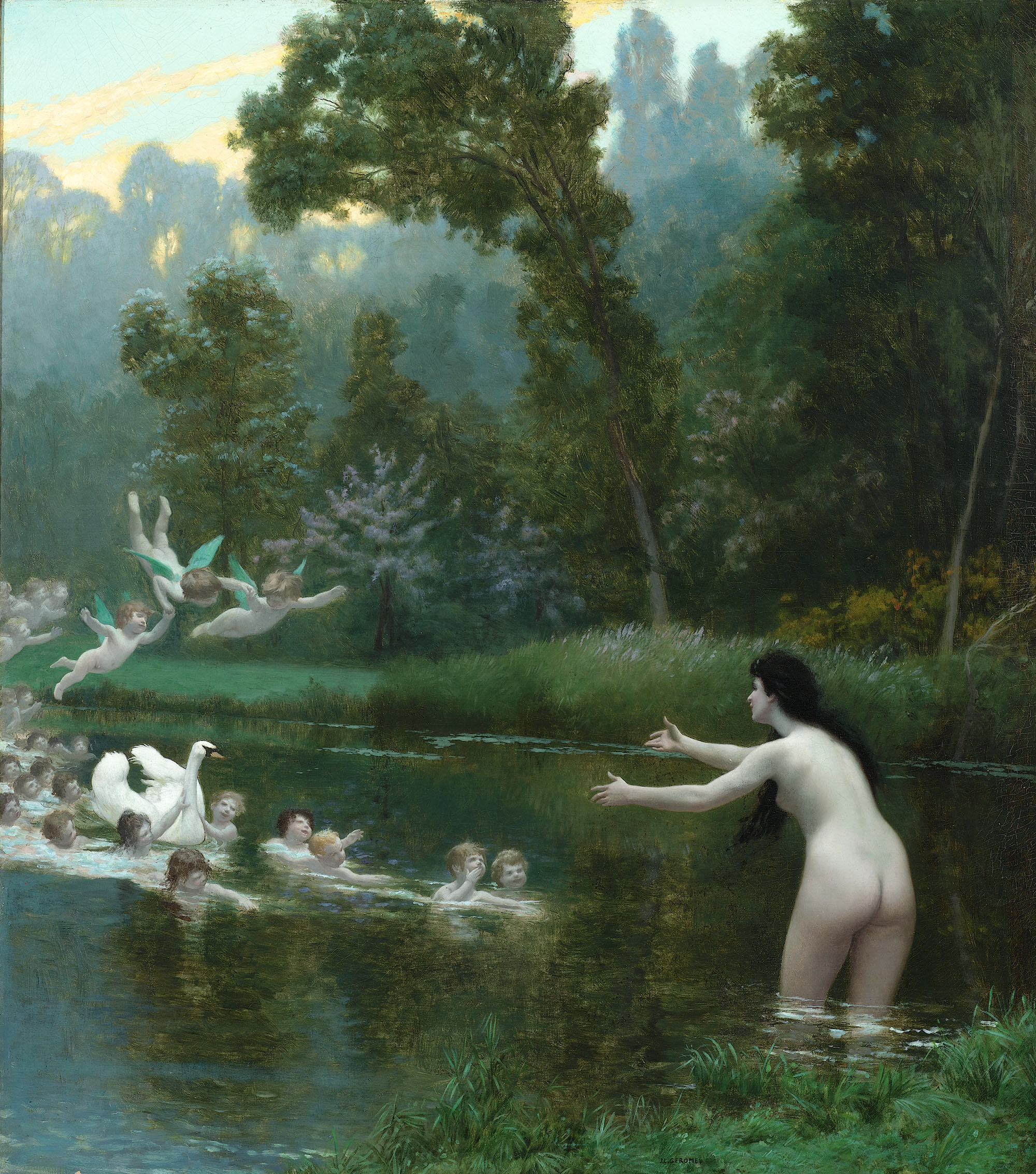
Leda and the Swan, 1895

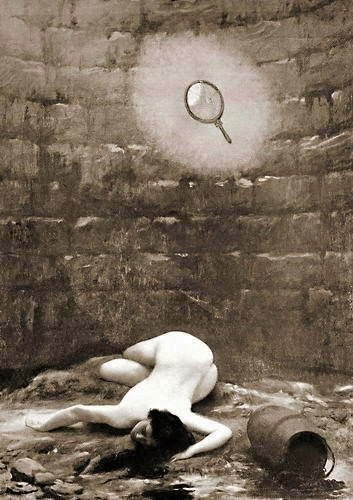
Mendacibus et histrionibus occisa in puteo jacet alma Veritas, 1895, location unknown

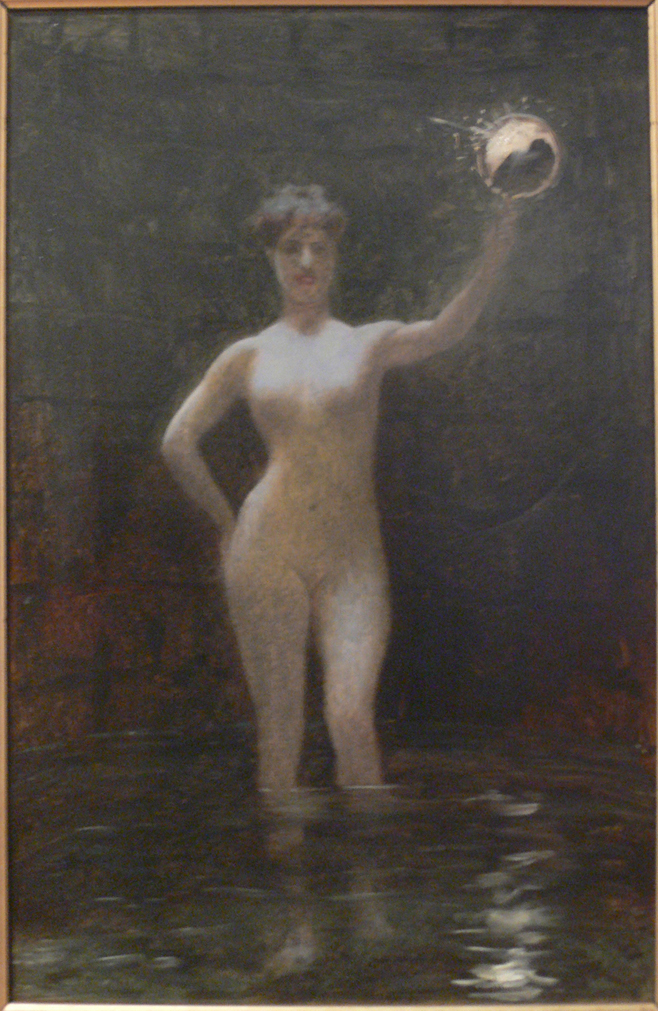
Truth at the Bottom of a Well, study for a painting of 1895, Musée Georges-Garret, Vesoul

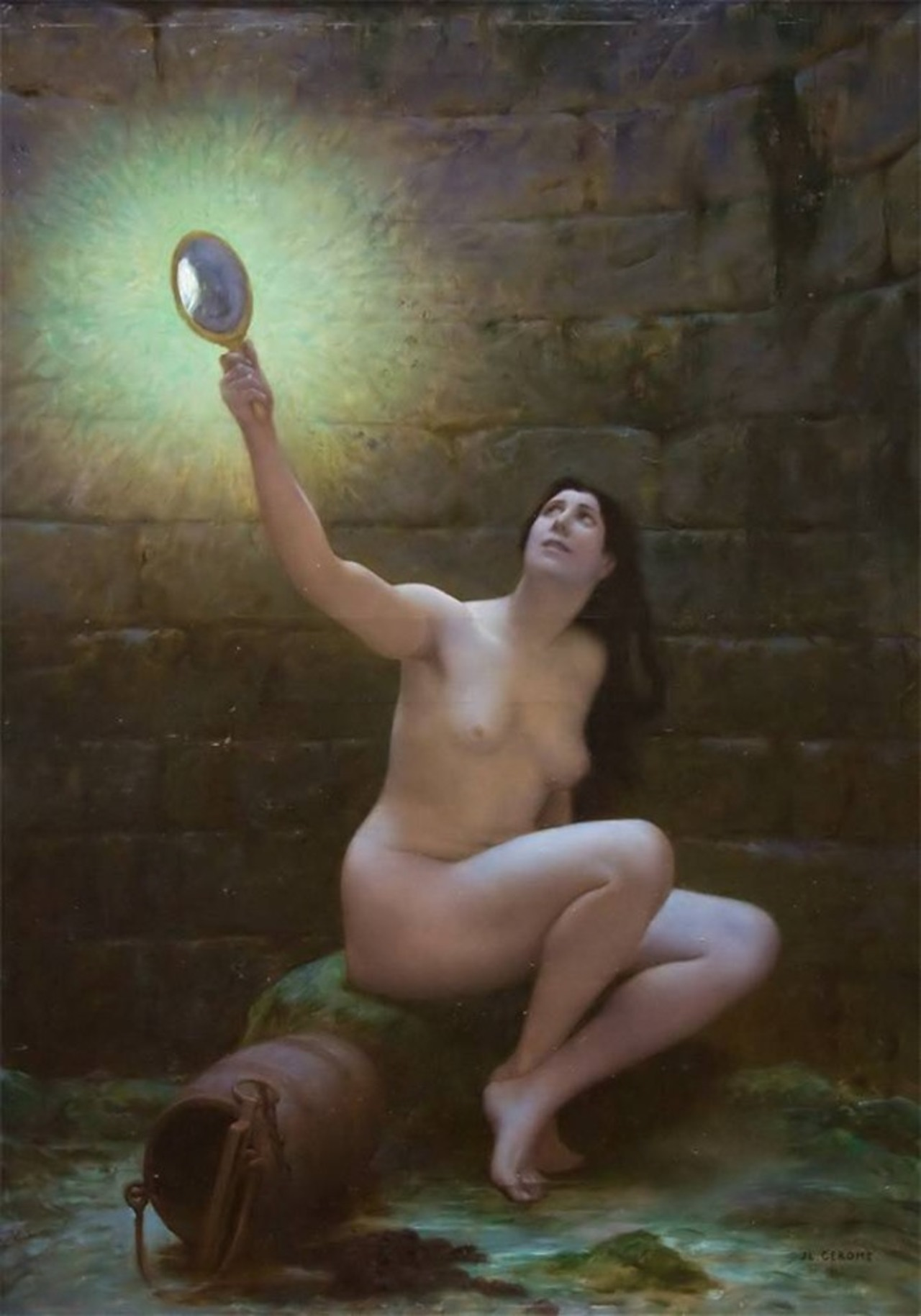
Truth Is at the Bottom of the Well, 1895, Musée des beaux-arts de Lyon

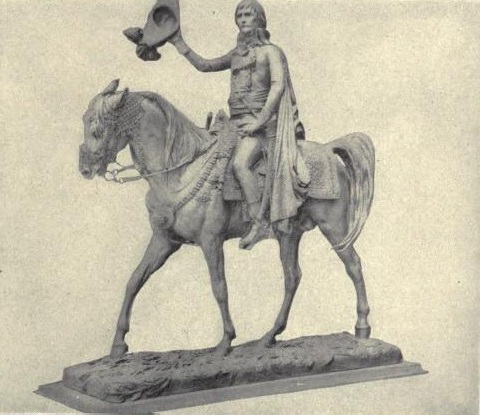
Bonaparte Entering Cairo, 1897

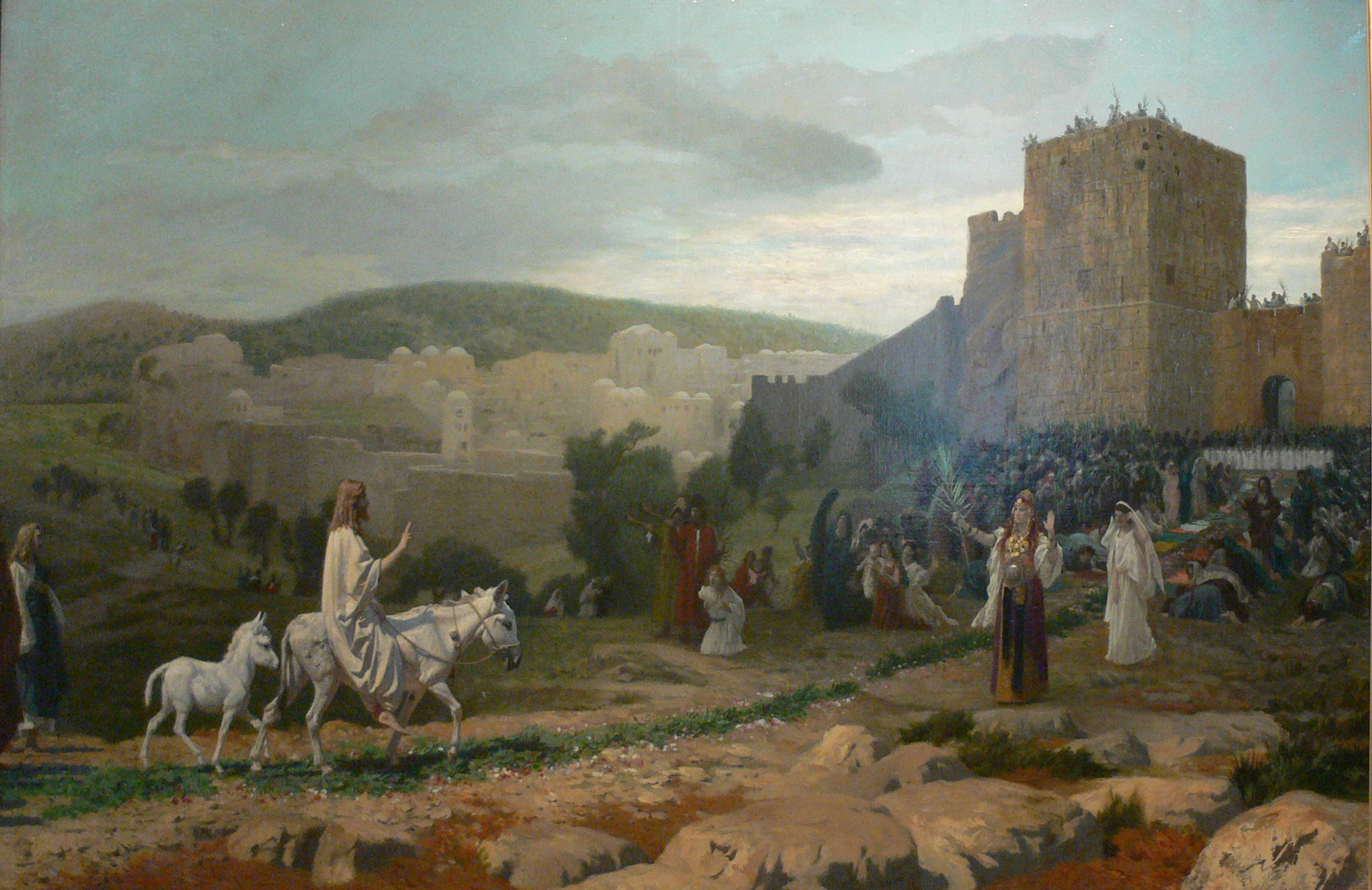
Entry of the Christ at Jerusalem, 1897, Musée Georges-Garret, Vesoul

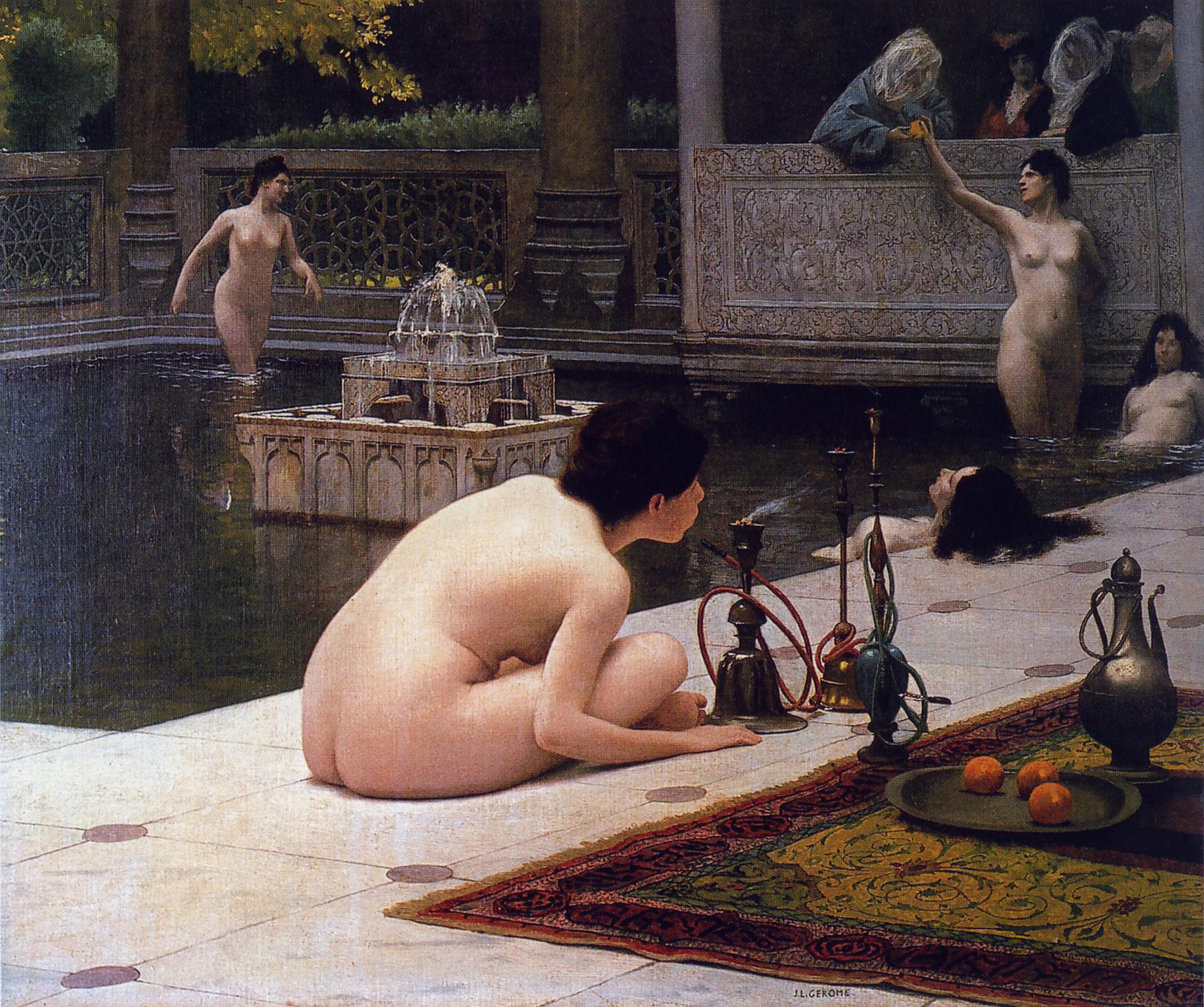
The Hookah Lighter, 1898, Khanenko Museum

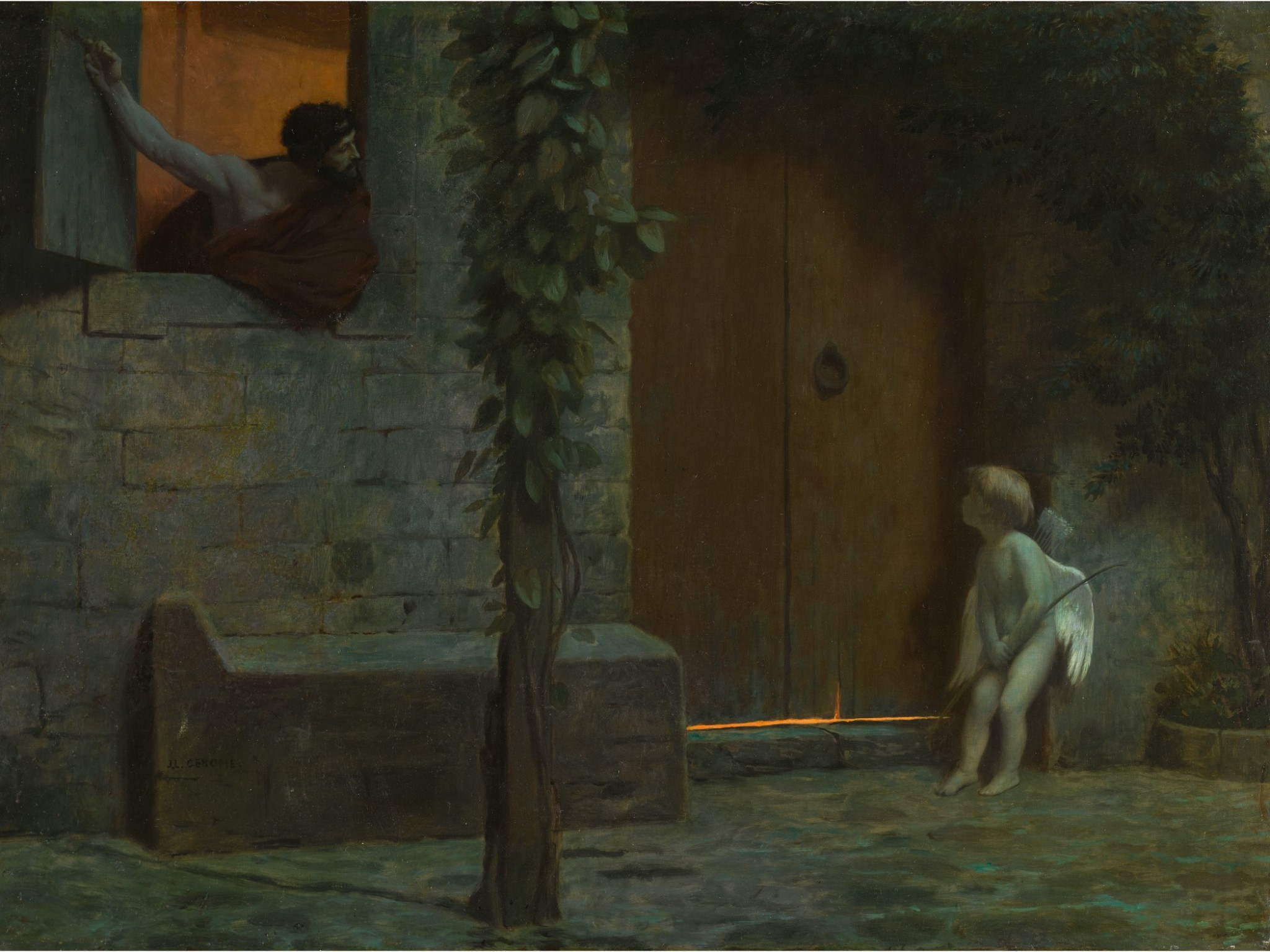
The Story of Anacreon 1: Cupid at the Door in a Rainstorm, c. 1899, private collection

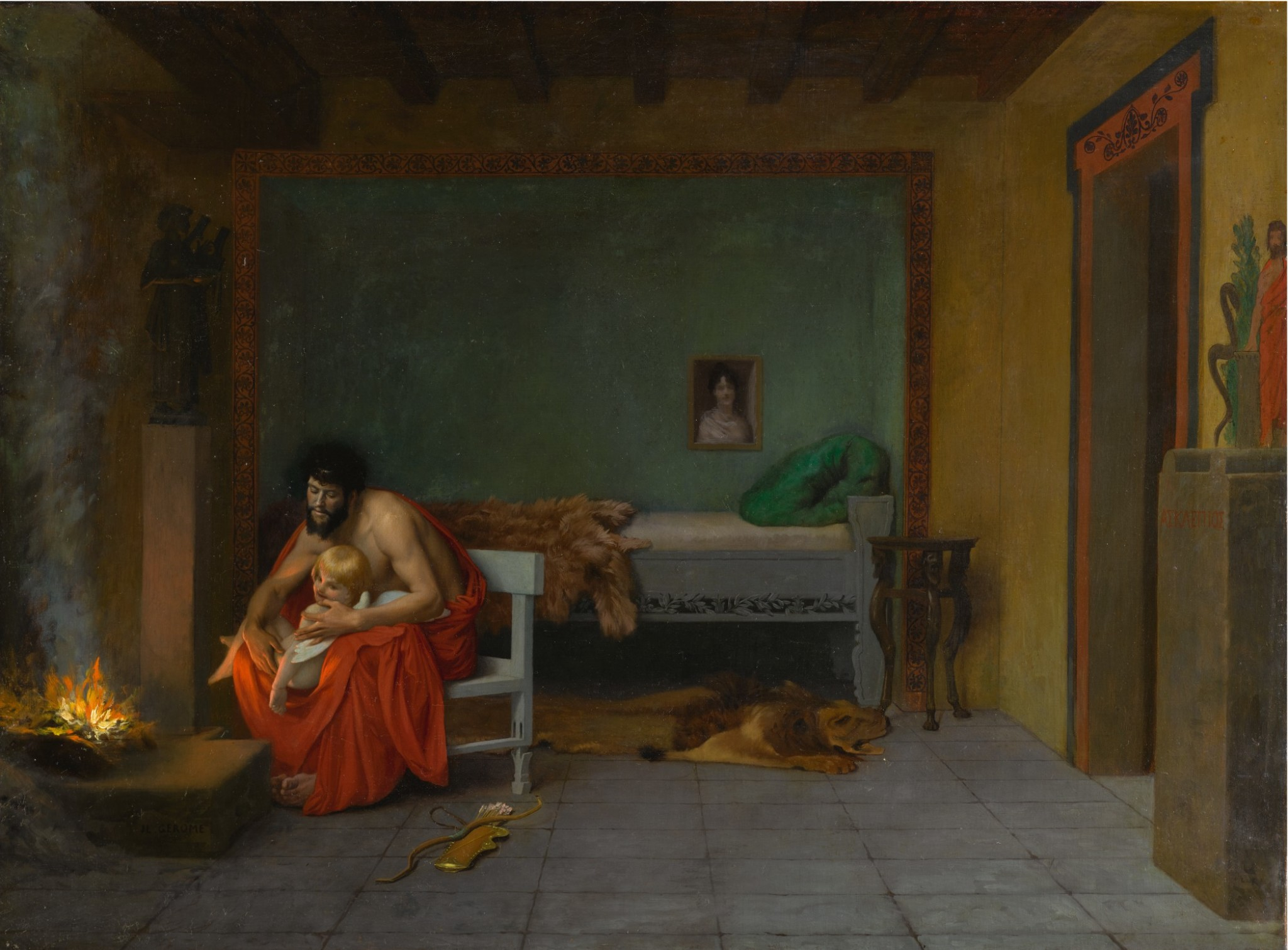
The Story of Anacreon 2: Young Love's Shivering Limbs the Embers Warm, c. 1899, private collection

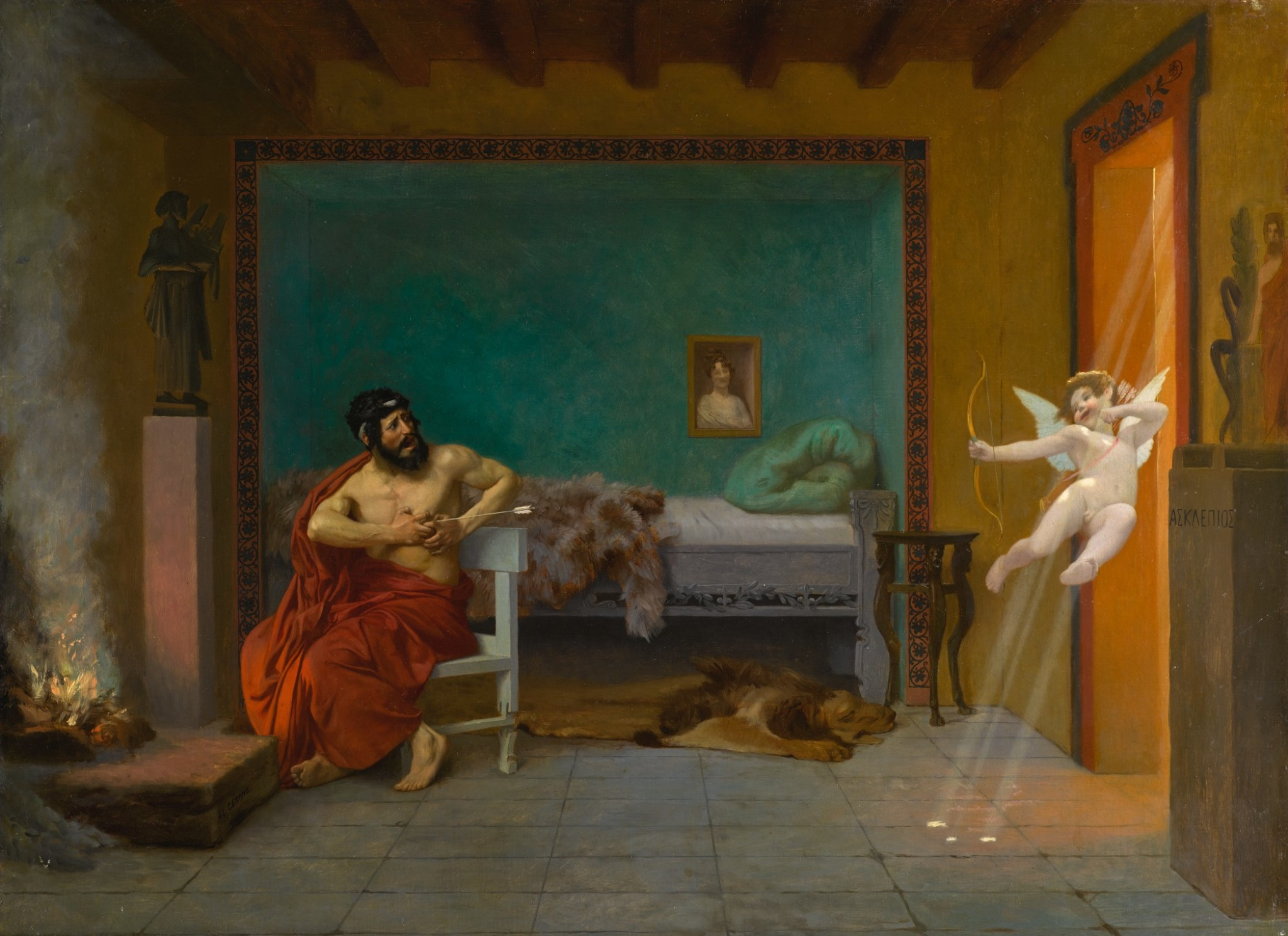
The Story of Anacreon 3: Cupid Runs out the Door, c. 1899, private collection

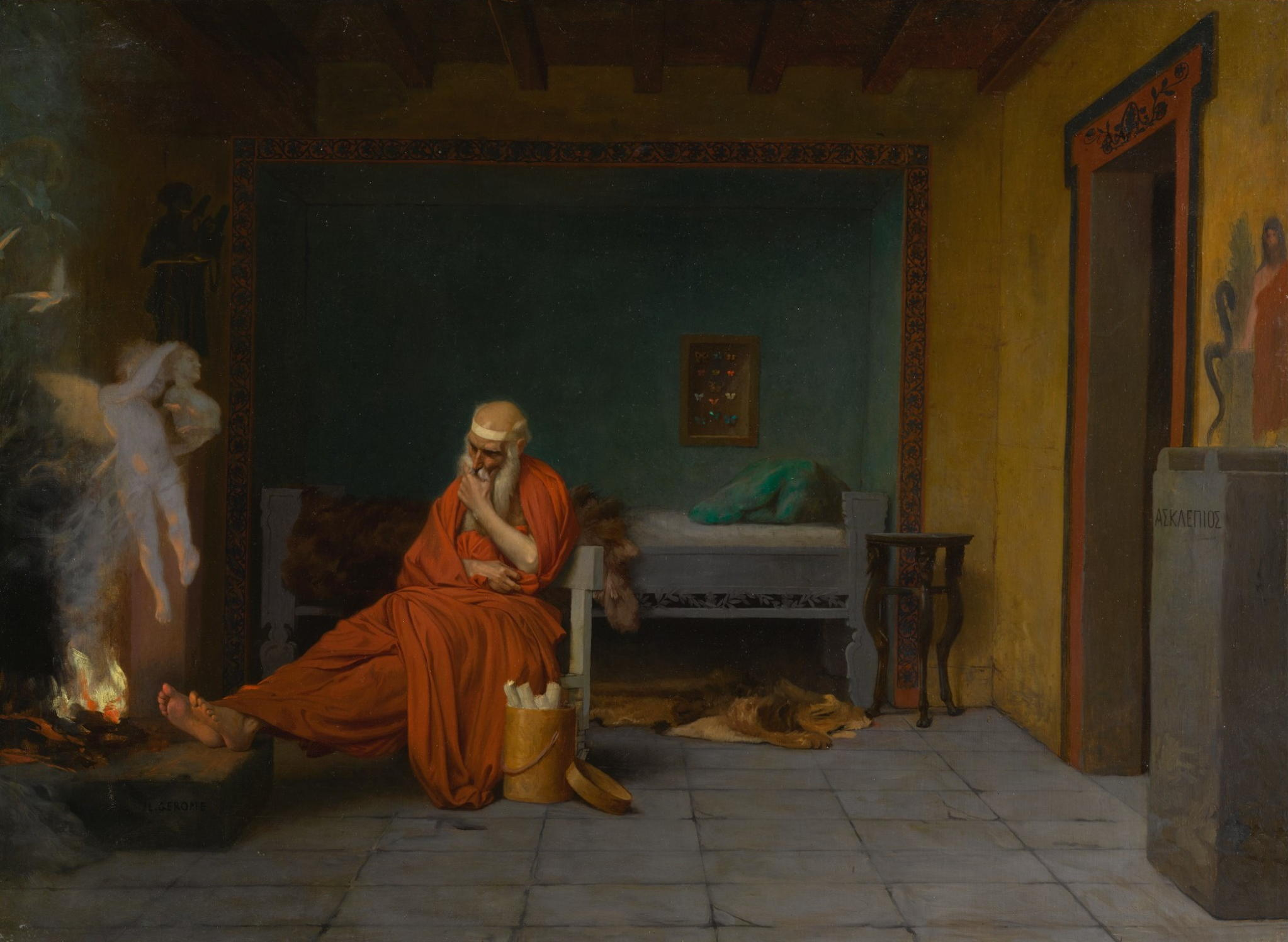
The Story of Anacreon 4: The Poet Dreams of Cupid by the Fire, c. 1899, private collection

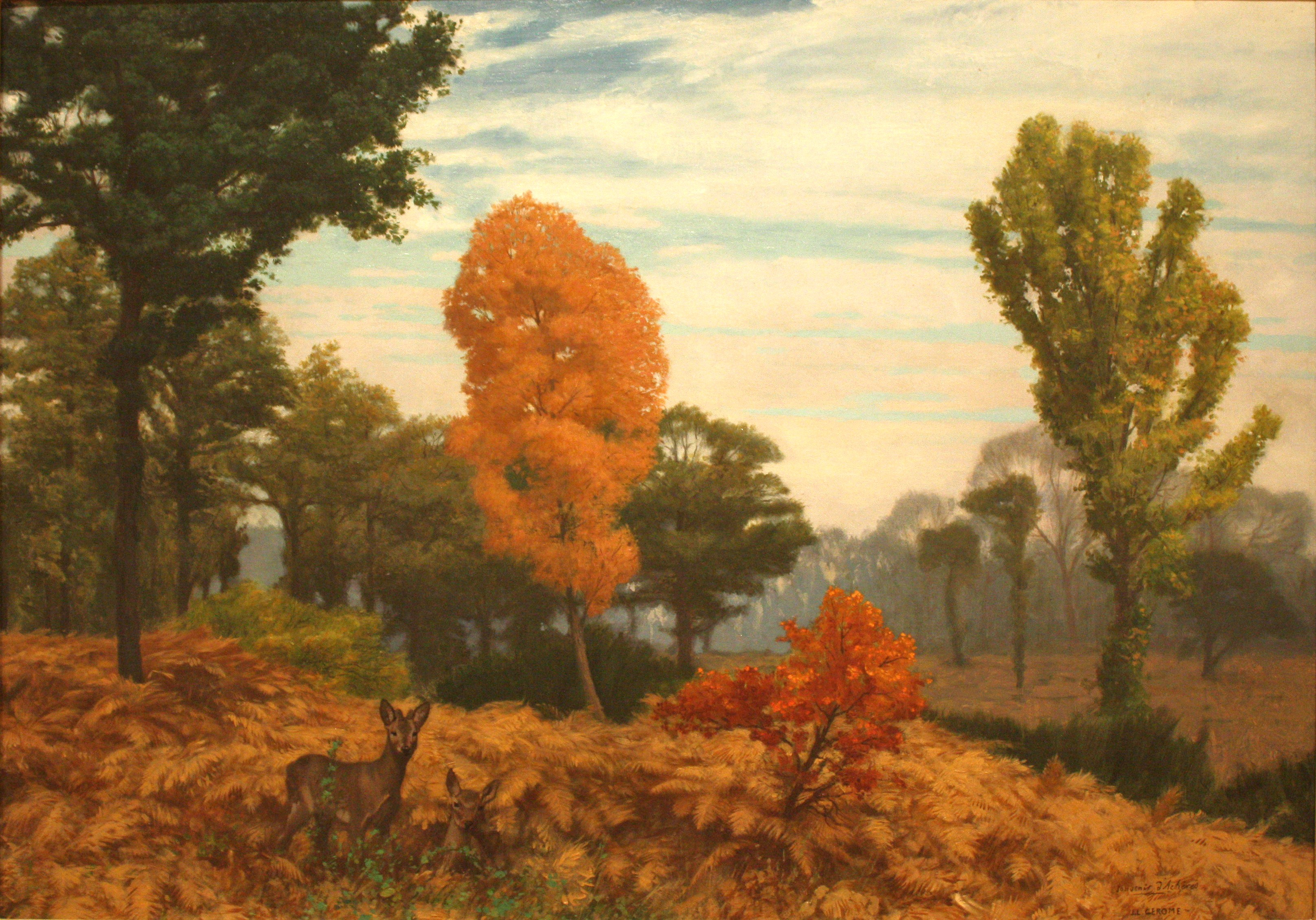
Souvenir of Achéres, 1903, Columbus Museum of Art

== Images of Gérôme ==
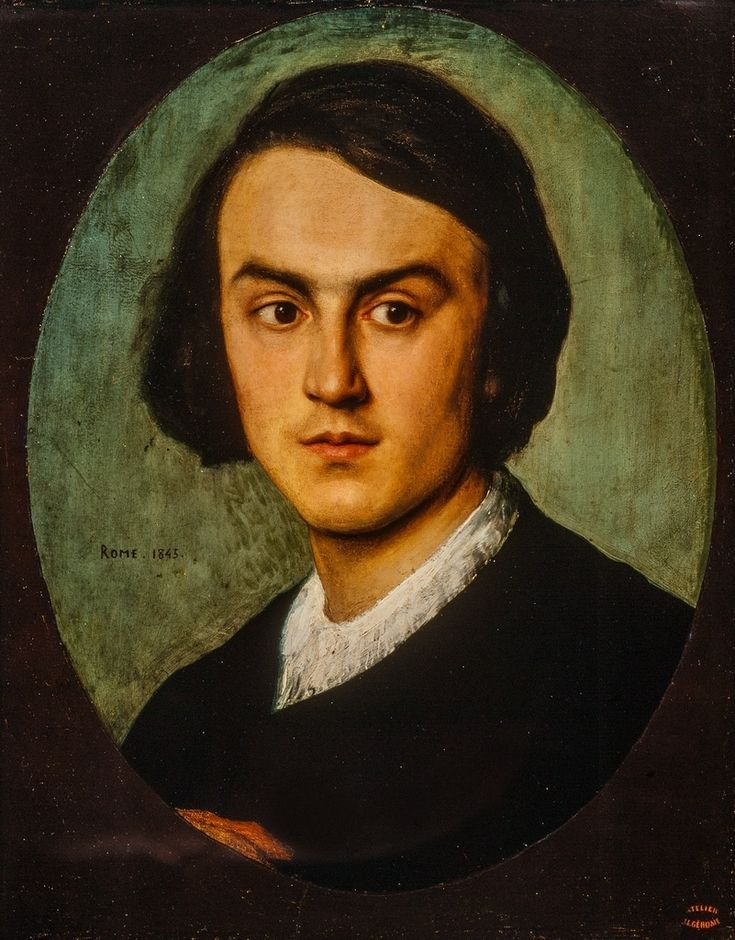
Jean-Léon Gérôme, self-portrait c. 1844, Eskenazi Museum of Art at Indiana University

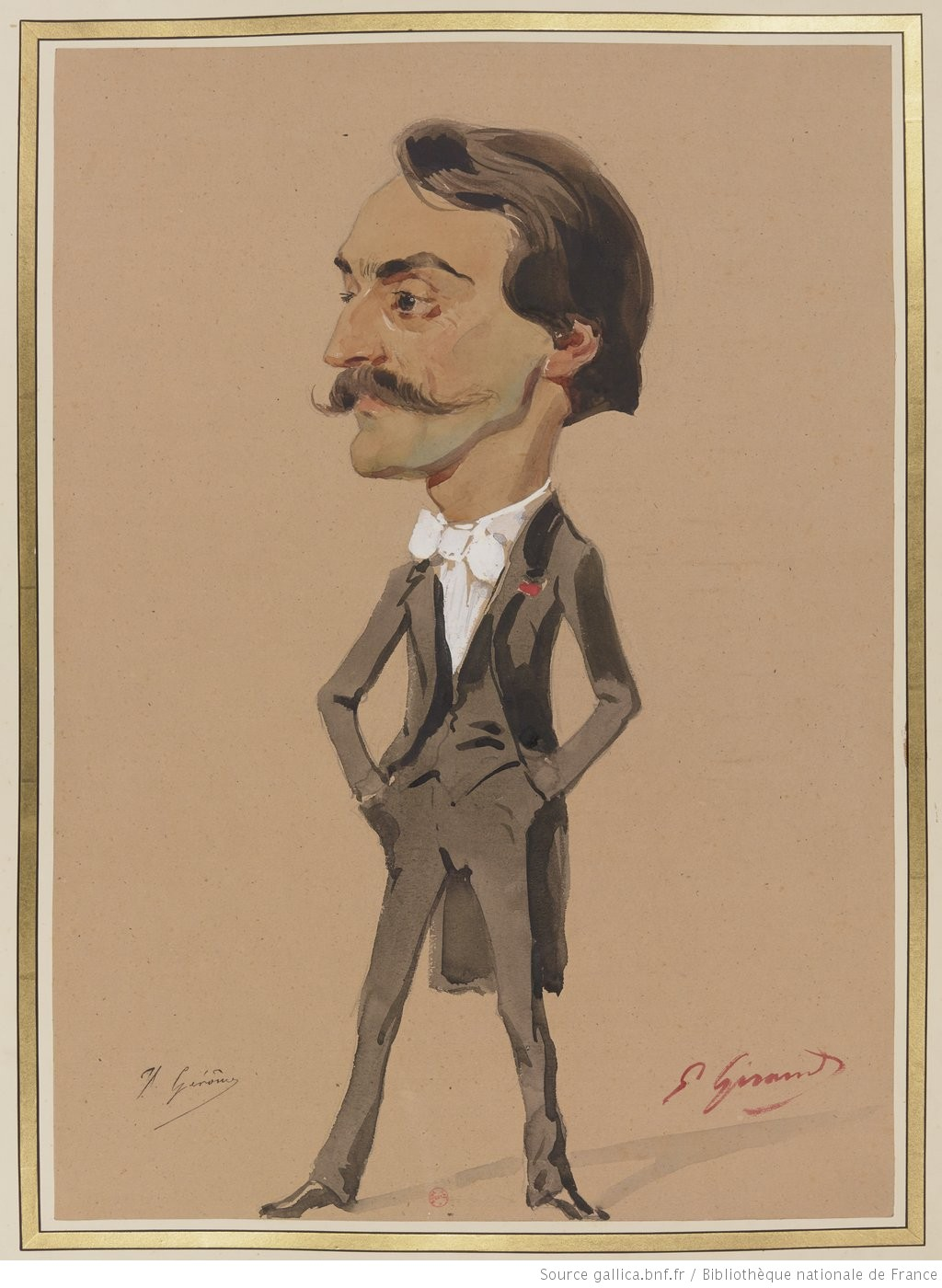
Eugène Giraud, caricature of Gérôme, between 1858 and 1870

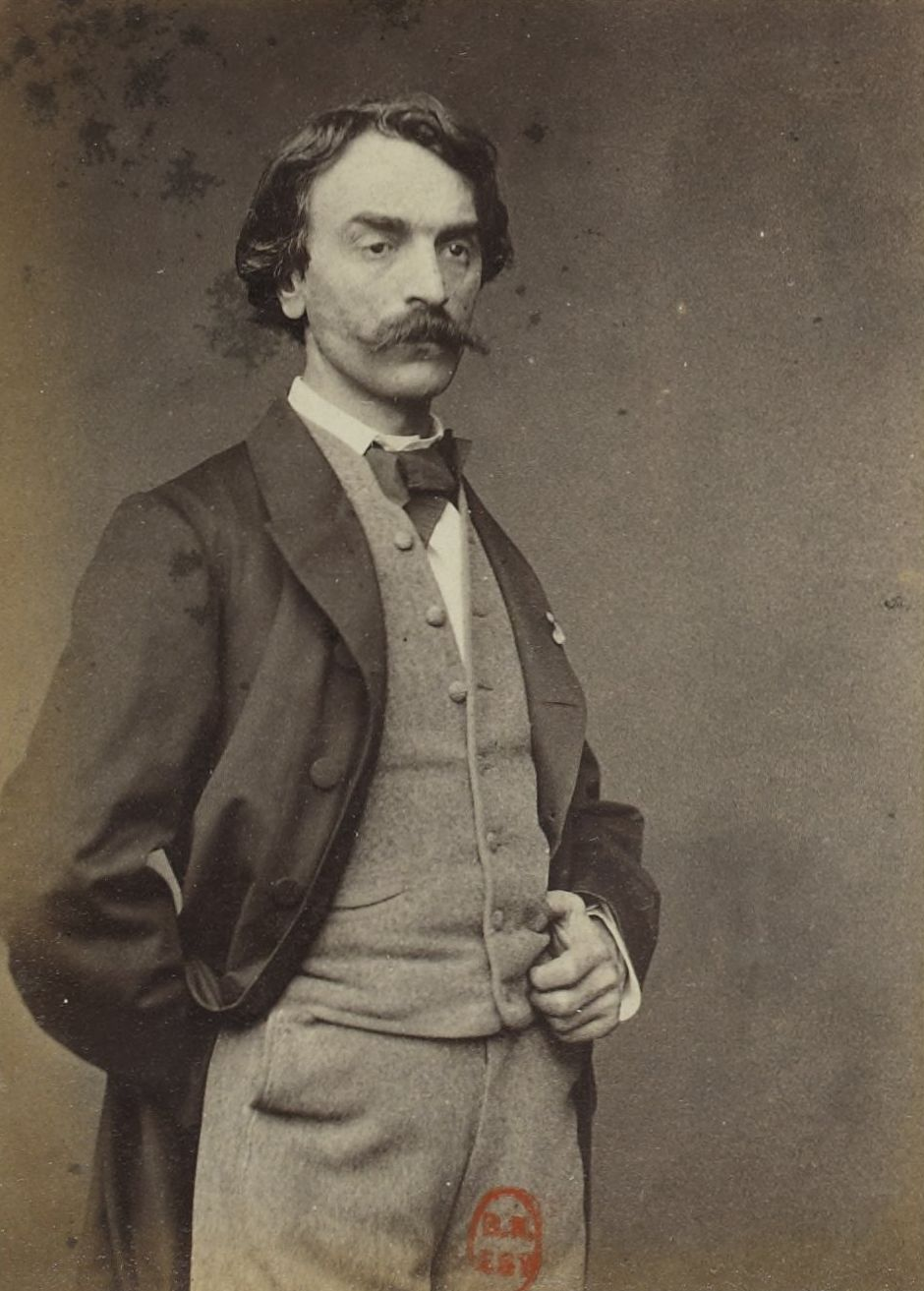
Robert Jefferson Bingham, portrait of Gérôme, between 1860 and 1875

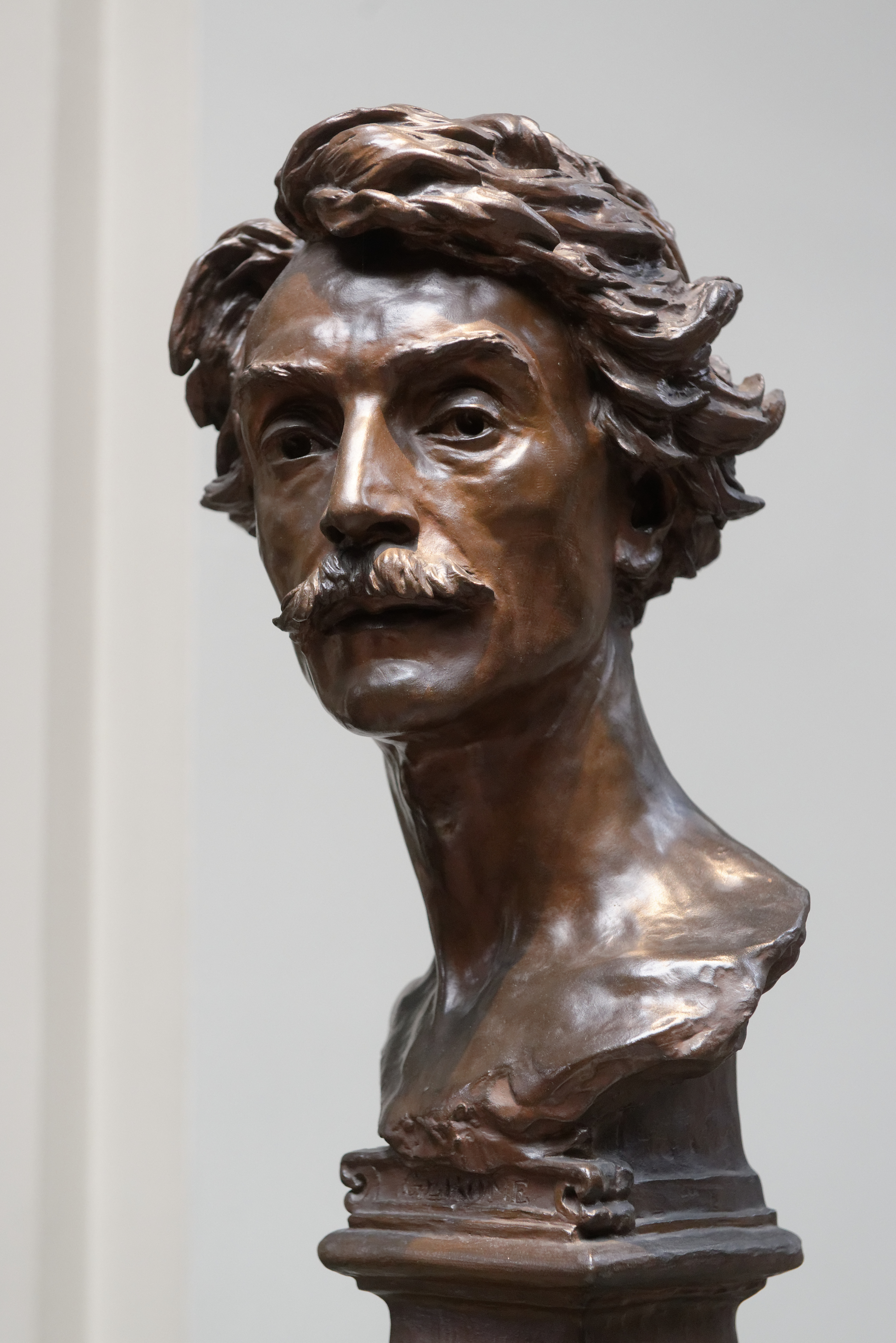
Jean-Baptiste Carpeaux, Bust of Jean-Léon Gérôme, after 1871, Ny Carlsberg Glyptotek, Copenhagen

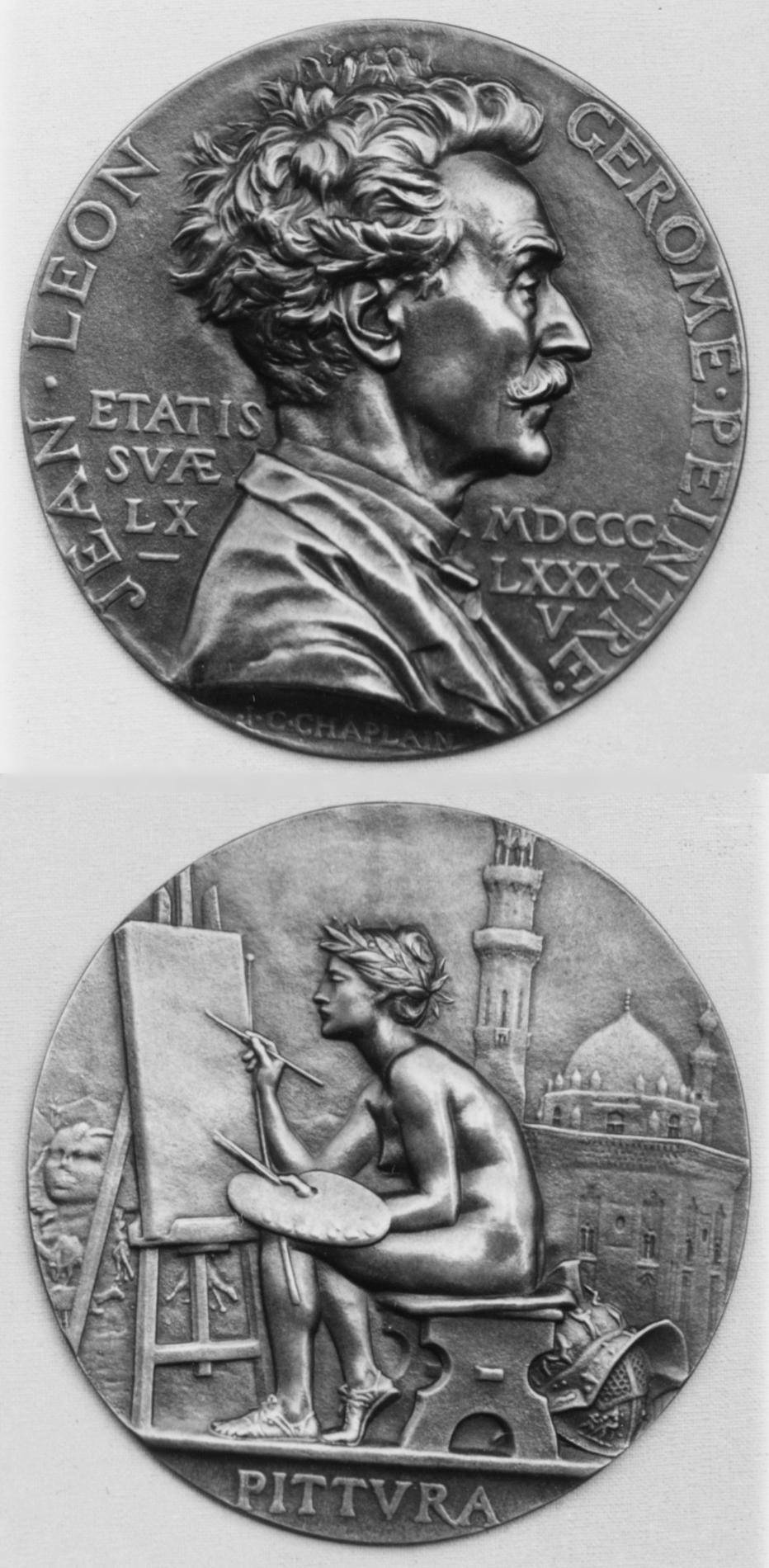
Jules-Clément Chaplain, Jean-Léon Gérôme medal, 1885, Metropolitan Museum of Art

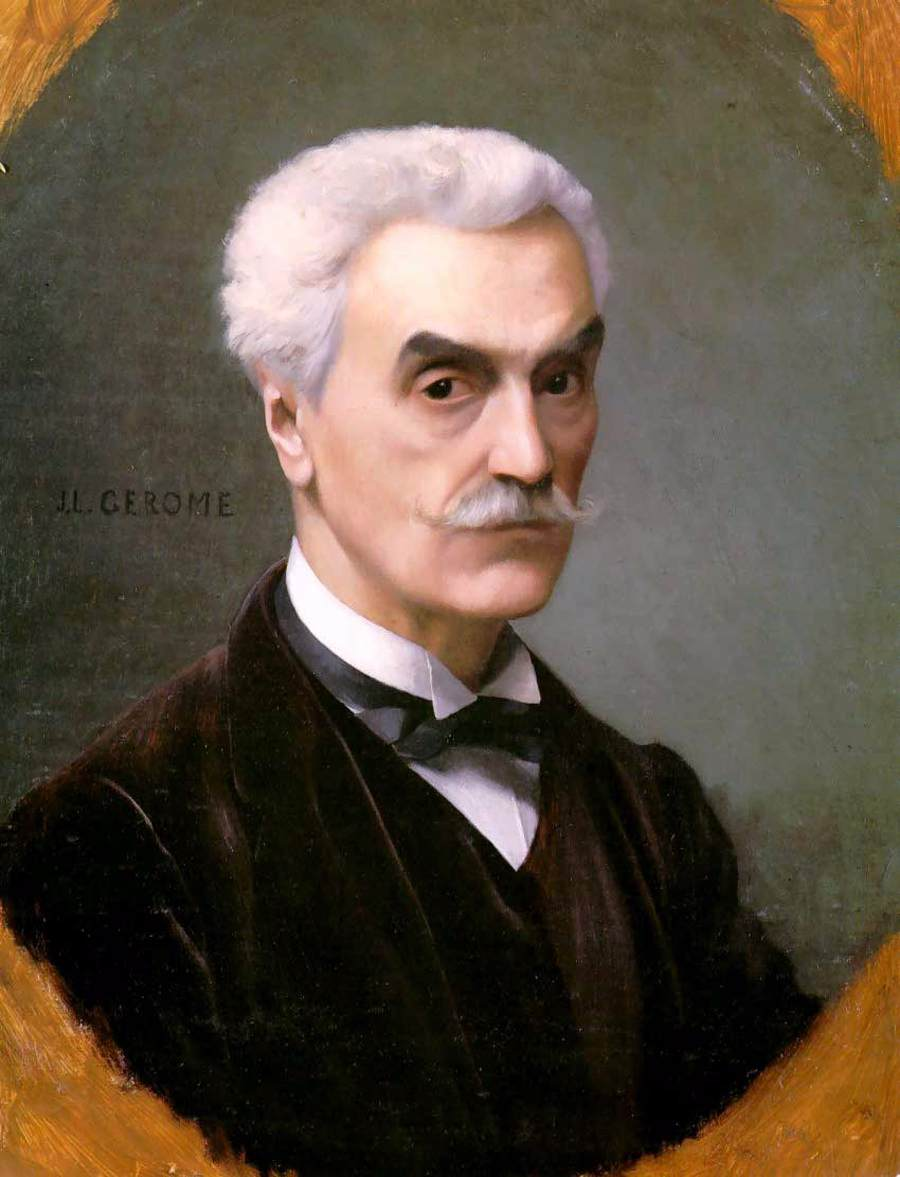
Self-portrait, 1886, Aberdeen Art Gallery

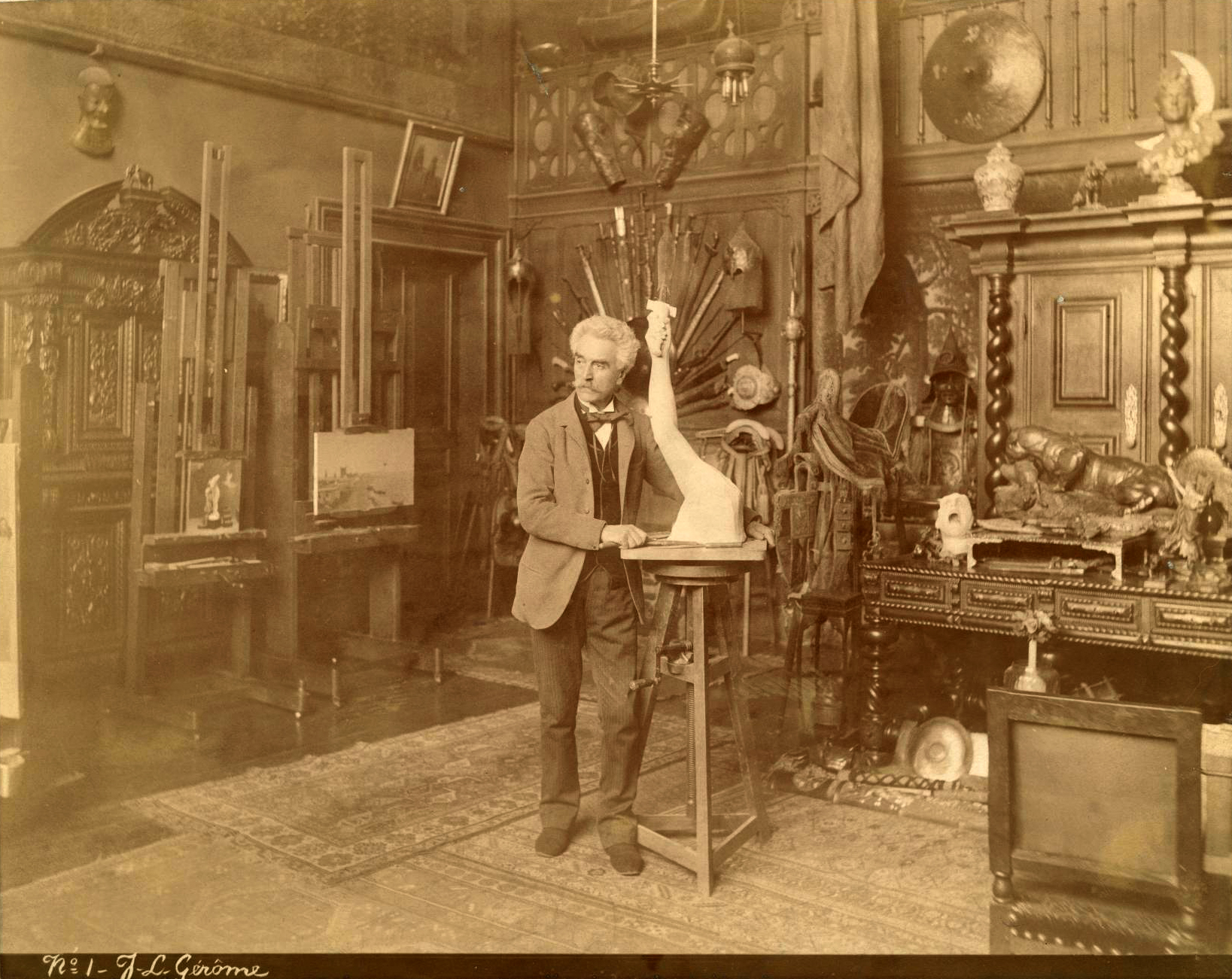
Jean-Léon Gérôme in his Paris studio, c. 1885–1890

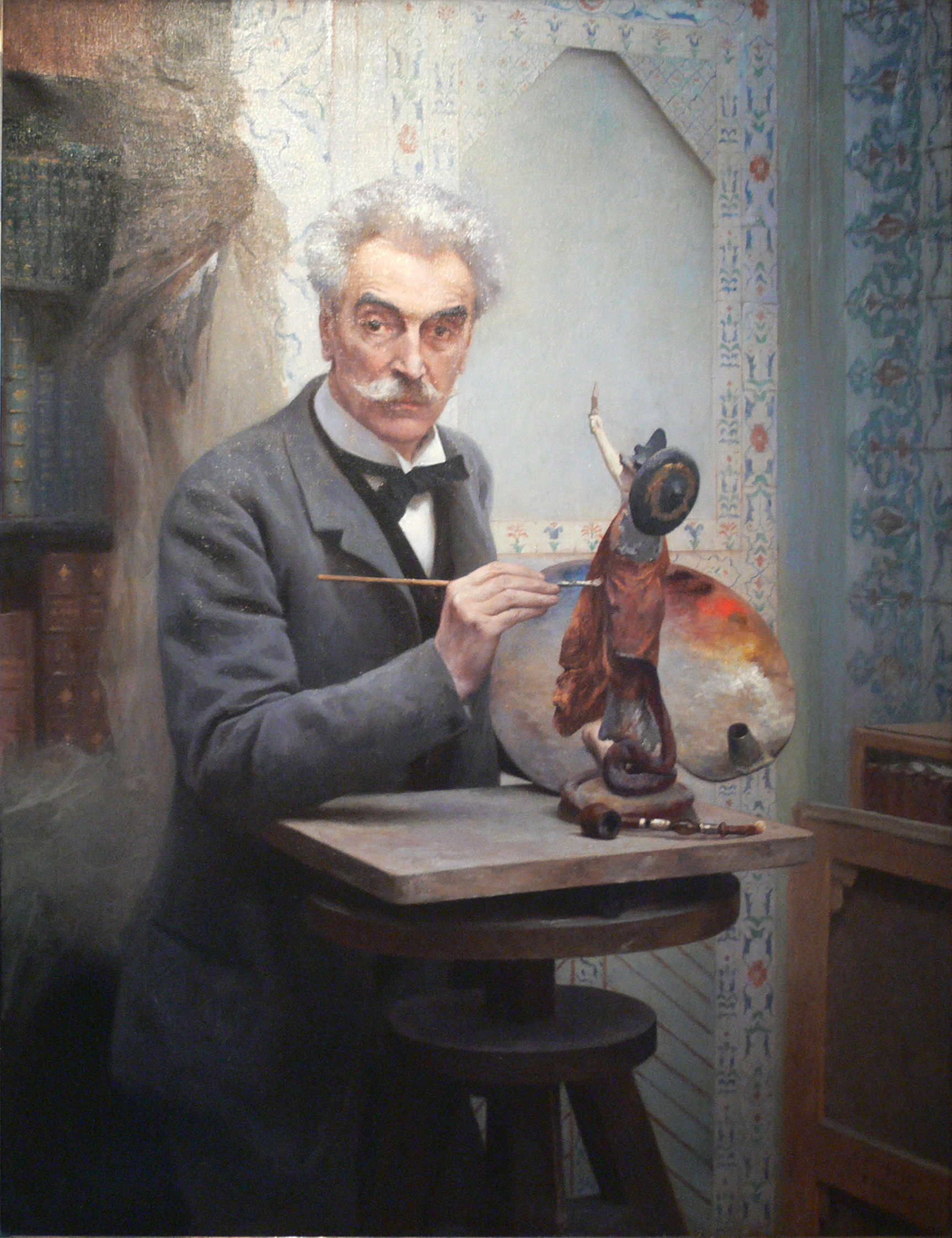
Fernand Cormon, The Sculptor at Work, 1891, Musée Georges-Garret, Vesoul

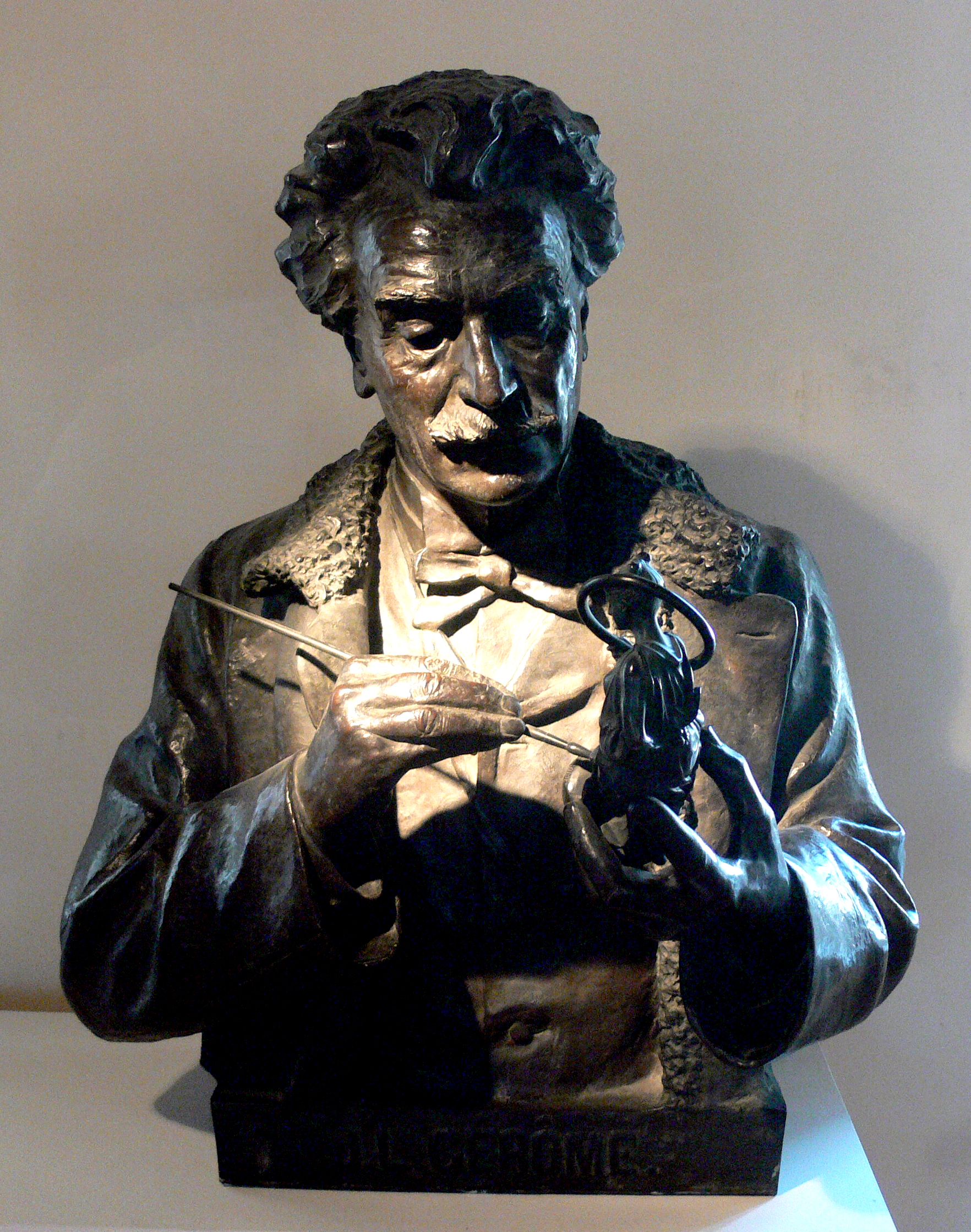
Léopold Bernhard Bernstamm, Gérome painting a hoop dancer, 1897, Musée Georges-Garret, Vesoul

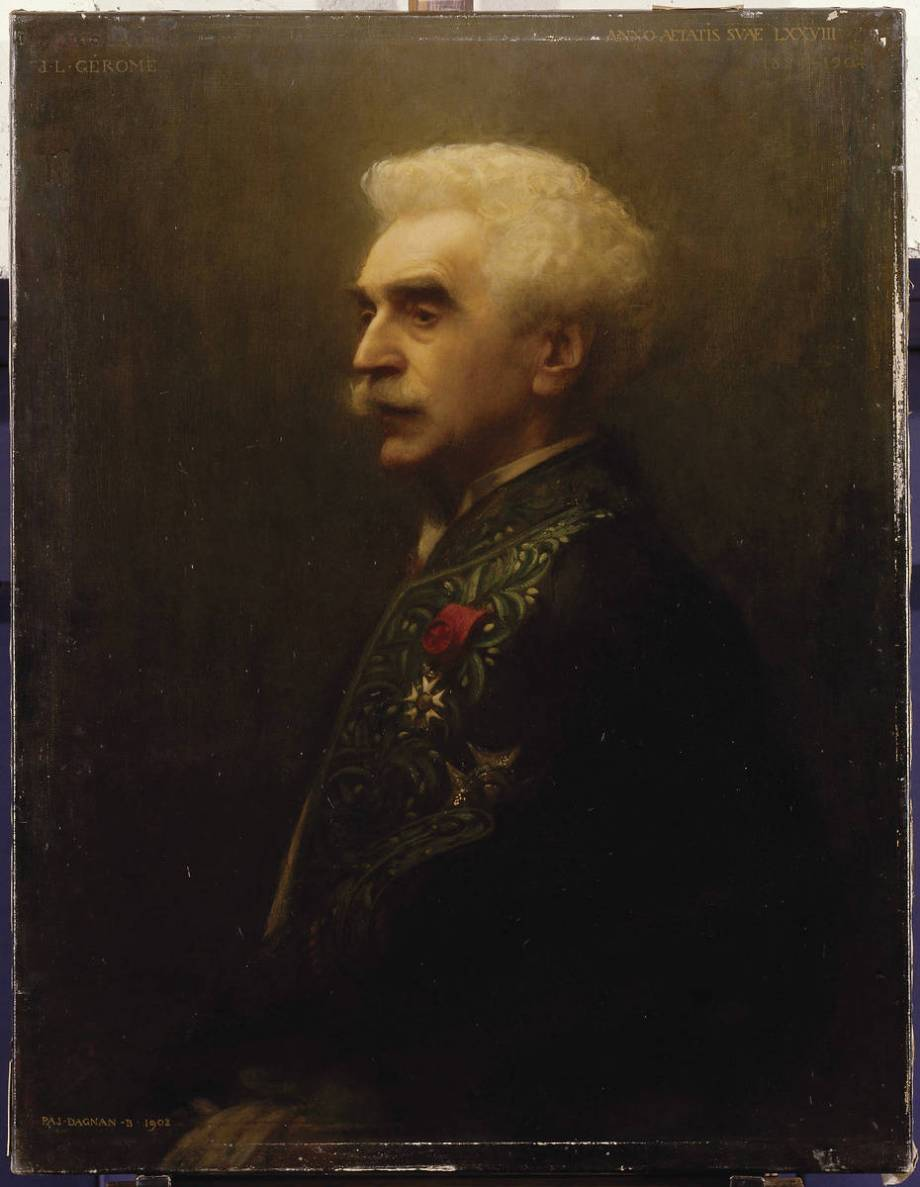
Pascal Dagnan-Bouveret, Portrait of Jean-Léon Gérôme, 1902, Palace of Versailles, Paris

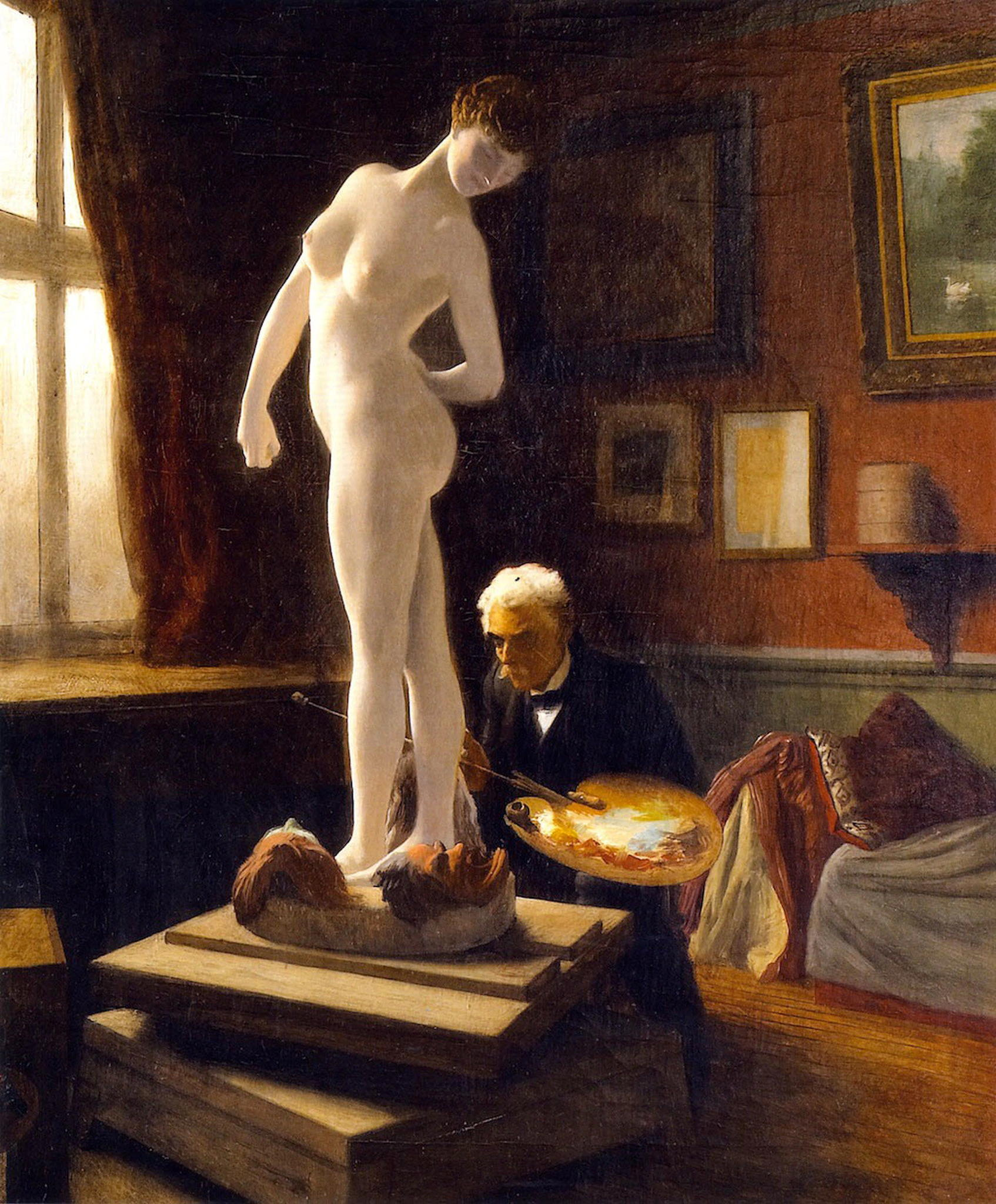
Self-portrait, painting The Ball Player, 1902, Musée Georges-Garret, Vesoul

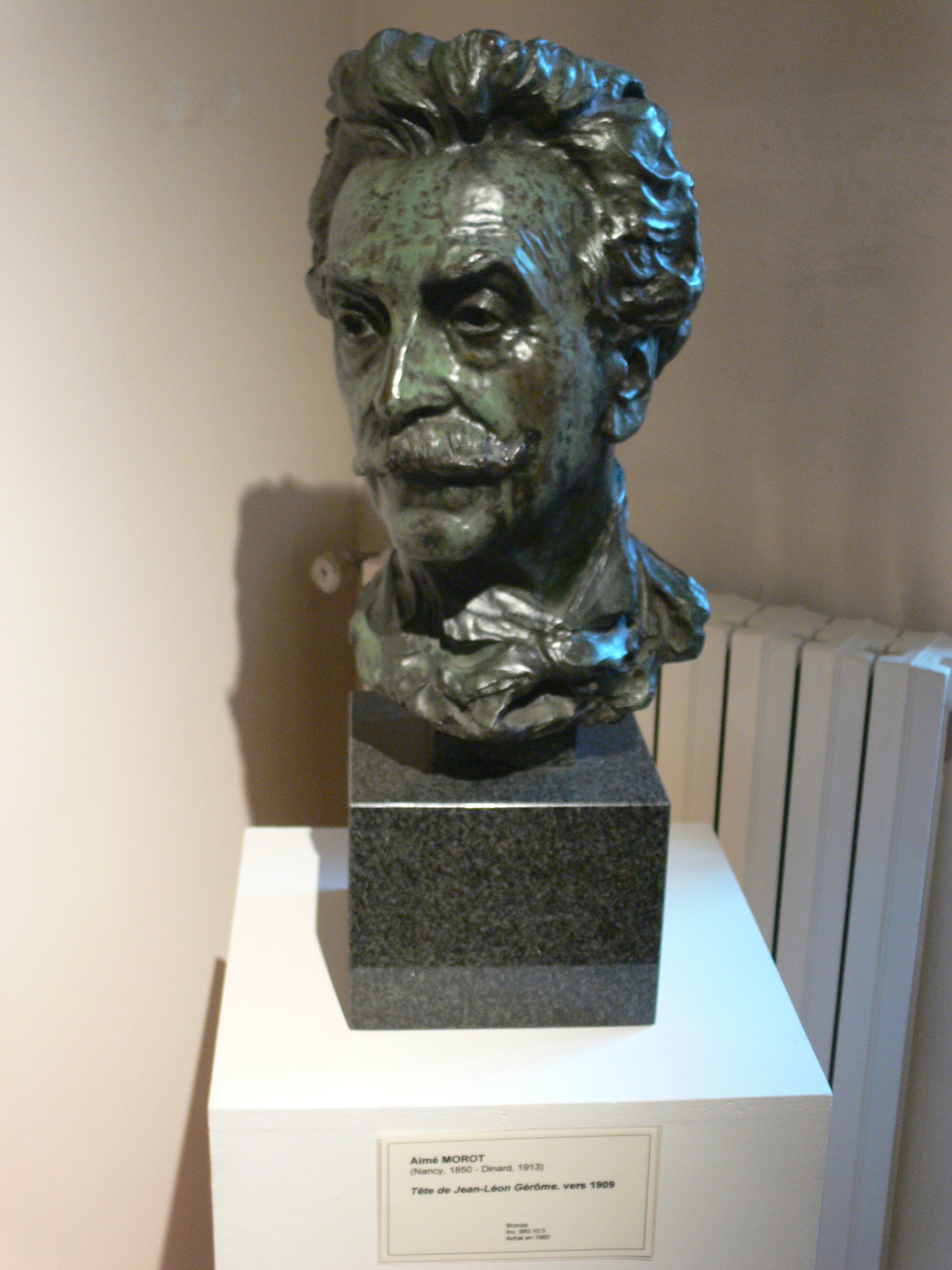
Aimé Morot, bronze head of Jean-Léon Gérôme, 1909, Musée Georges-Garret, Vesoul

== See also ==
- List of Orientalist artists
- List of pupils of Jean-Léon Gérôme
- Société des Peintres Orientalistes Français (Society of French Orientalist Painters)

== References and sources ==
=== Sources ===
- Ackerman, Gerald (1986). The life and work of Jean-Léon Gérôme; catalogue raisonné. Sotheby's Publications. ISBN 0-85667-311-0.
- Ackerman, Gerald (2000). Jean-Léon Gérôme. Monographie révisée, catalogie raisonné mis a jour. ACR. ISBN 2-86770-137-6.
- Allan, Scott (2010). "Introduction". In Allan, Scott; Morton, Mary (eds.). Reconsidering Gérôme. Los Angeles: J. Paul Getty Museum. ISBN 978-1-60606-038-4.
- Bayard, Émile; preface by Jean Léon Gérôme. Le Nu Esthétique. Paris: Bernard, 1902.
- Beeny, Emily (2010). "Blood Spectacle: Gérôme in the Arena". In Allan, Scott; Morton, Mary (eds.). Reconsidering Gérôme. Los Angeles: J. Paul Getty Museum. ISBN 978-1-60606-038-4.
- Benezit E. - Dictionnaire des Peintres, Sculpteurs, Dessinateurs et Graveurs - Librairie Gründ, Paris, 1976; ISBN 2-7000-0156-7 (in French)
- Laurence des Cars, Dominque de Font-Rélaux and Édouard Papet (ed.), The Spectacular Art of Jean-Léon Gérôme (1824–1904), Getty Museum and Musée d'Orsay, 2010.
- Chisholm, Hugh, ed. "Gérôme, Jean Léon," Encyclopædia Britannica (11th ed.). Cambridge University, 1901.
- Garvey, Dana M. Edwin Lord Weeks: An American Artist in North Africa and South Asia, dissertation, University of Washington, 2013.
- Gérôme, Jean-Léon (1903). Preface to Charles Jalabert: l'homme, l'artiste, d'après sa correspondance by Émile Reinaud. Paris: Hachette, 1903, pp. 5–7.
- Hering, Fanny Field; introduction by Augustus St. Gaudens. Gérôme: The Life and Works of Jean-Léon Gérôme. New York, Cassell Publishing Company, 1892.
- Lees, Sarah. 2012. "Jean-Léon Gérôme: Slave Market". In Nineteenth-century European Paintings at the Sterling and Francine Clark Art Institute, edited by S. Lees. 359–363. Williamstown, Mass: Sterling and Francine Clark Art Institute.
- Mitchell, Claudine (2010). "The Damaged Mirror: Gérôme's Narrative Technique and the Fractures of French History". In Allan, Scott; Morton, Mary (eds.). Reconsidering Gérôme. Los Angeles: J. Paul Getty Museum. ISBN 978-1-60606-038-4.
- Moreau-Vauthier, Charles. Gérôme: peintre et sculpteur (in French). Hachette, 1906.
- Nochlin, Linda. 1983. "The Imaginary Orient". Art in America 71(5): 118–31, 187–91.
- O'Sullivan N. Aloysius O'Kelly: Art, Nation, Empire, Field Day Publications, 2010.
- Scott C. Allan and Mary Morton (ed.), Reconsidering Gérôme, Los Angeles: J. Paul Getty Museum, 2010, in: Art Bulletin 94 (2012), No. 2, pp. 312–316
- Toledano, Ehud R. 1998. Slavery and Abolition in the Ottoman Middle East. Seattle/London: University of Washington Press.
- Turner, J. – Grove Dictionary of Art – Oxford University Press, USA; new edition (January 2, 1996); ISBN 0-19-517068-7
- Catalogue of the exhibition in the Musée de Vésoul (August 1981). Jean-Léon Gérôme : peintre, sculpteur et graveur; ses oeuvres conservées dans les collections françaises et privées. Ville de Vésoul.
