= Omphale (disambiguation) =

Omphale was a legendary queen of Lydia in Greek mythology.

Omphale may also refer to:

- Omphale (Gérôme sculpture), a sculpture of the queen by Jean-Léon Gérôme
- Omphale (horse) (1781–1799), a British Thoroughbred racehorse and broodmare
- Omphale (wasp), a genus of hymenoptera of the family Eulophidae
- Daedalium, an ancient city of Sicily, which was also known as Omphale
