= Emma Dupont =

French art model (fl. 1876–1890)

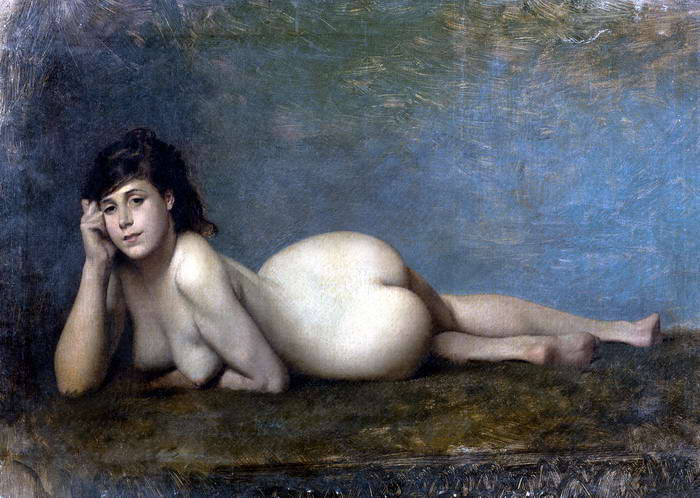
- Famous nude painting of Emma Dupont by Jean-Léon Gérôme on his original canvas with scratches
- Born: unknown Unknown
- Died: Unknown; Unknown
- Occupation: Model
- Years active: 1876–1890
- Known for: Modeling for paintings and sculptures by Jean-Léon Gérôme

Emma Dupont (fl. 1876–1890) was a French model, known for posing for paintings and sculptures for various 19th-century artists, mainly Jean-Léon Gérôme. She modeled for several of Gérôme's famous works depicting scenes from antiquity, including Pool in a Harem, Omphale, Tanagra, and Pygmalion and Galatea. Dupont began modeling out of necessity after being abandoned in Paris as a teenager but went on to have a successful career posing for celebrated artists of the era. Her regular income allowed her to maintain a modest apartment that displayed artworks gifted to her by the painters and sculptors for whom she modeled.

== Early life ==
Similar to many other models of the time,Emma Dupont had come to Paris with her boyfriend at the age of seventeen. Her town of origin is unknown. When she was abandoned by her boyfriend, Dupont found herself alone in an unfamiliar city. According to her biography written by Paul Dollfus in 1896 (although novelized and full of anecdotes), Dupont was wandering in front of a cafe that she used to frequent with her ex-boyfriend when the owner noticed her. When Dupont tearfully explained her situation to him, the owner gave her some money and told her to return the next morning, promising that he would try to find her a job. When Dupont returned, the cafe owner took her to the Belgian painter Alfred Stevens.

== Modeling career ==
Dupont intended to pose for her face or in costume, but she shyly refused to pose nude. However, artist Fernand Cormon persuaded her to undress, and due to his encouragement, Dupont got used to posing without veils, becoming a nude model. Soon Dupont modeled for artists such as Tony Faivre, Auguste Feyen-Perrin, and Jean-Léon Gérôme. According to Paul Dollfus, her regular income allowed her to live in a small apartment on the boulevard de Clichy, which was decorated with works artists she had modeled for had given her. In fact, Gérôme had given her a study for the painting Pool in a Harem (1876), which remained in the model's family's possession even after Dupont's death, until it was sold.

== Notable works as model ==
Gérôme's Pool in a Harem, dating from 1876, features Dupont providing the pose of a bather. In 1886, Dupont lent her features to Omphale, Gérôme's feminine reinterpretation of the Farnese Hercules. On that occasion, the artist had himself photographed in his studio by Louis Bonnard alongside a clay sketch of the work and his model. This theme of the artist with the model in the studio would be taken up again later by the artist. In the painting The End of the Session, or La fine della seduta, Emma Dupont herself is depicted covering the clay model of Omphale with a cloth while the sculptor washes his tools. Later, in the painting Working in Marble (1890), Jean-Léon Gérôme portrayed himself sculpting a marble statue, Tanagra, next to his model, seated in the same rigid position as the sculpture. It is therefore thought that Dupont was also the model for the Tanagra of 1890. It is also hypothesized that Dupont lent her features to the Galatea in the painting Pygmalion and Galatea, dating from 1890.

== Gallery ==
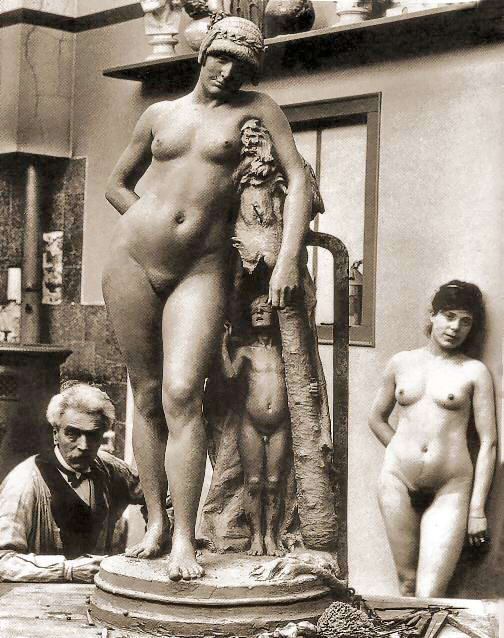
Gérôme's sculpture "Omphale" with the artist and his model, believed to be Emma Dupont

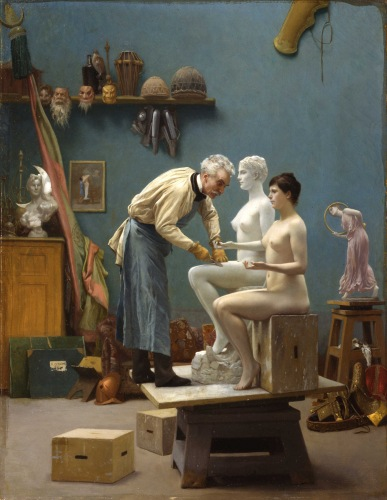
Working in Marble, 1890

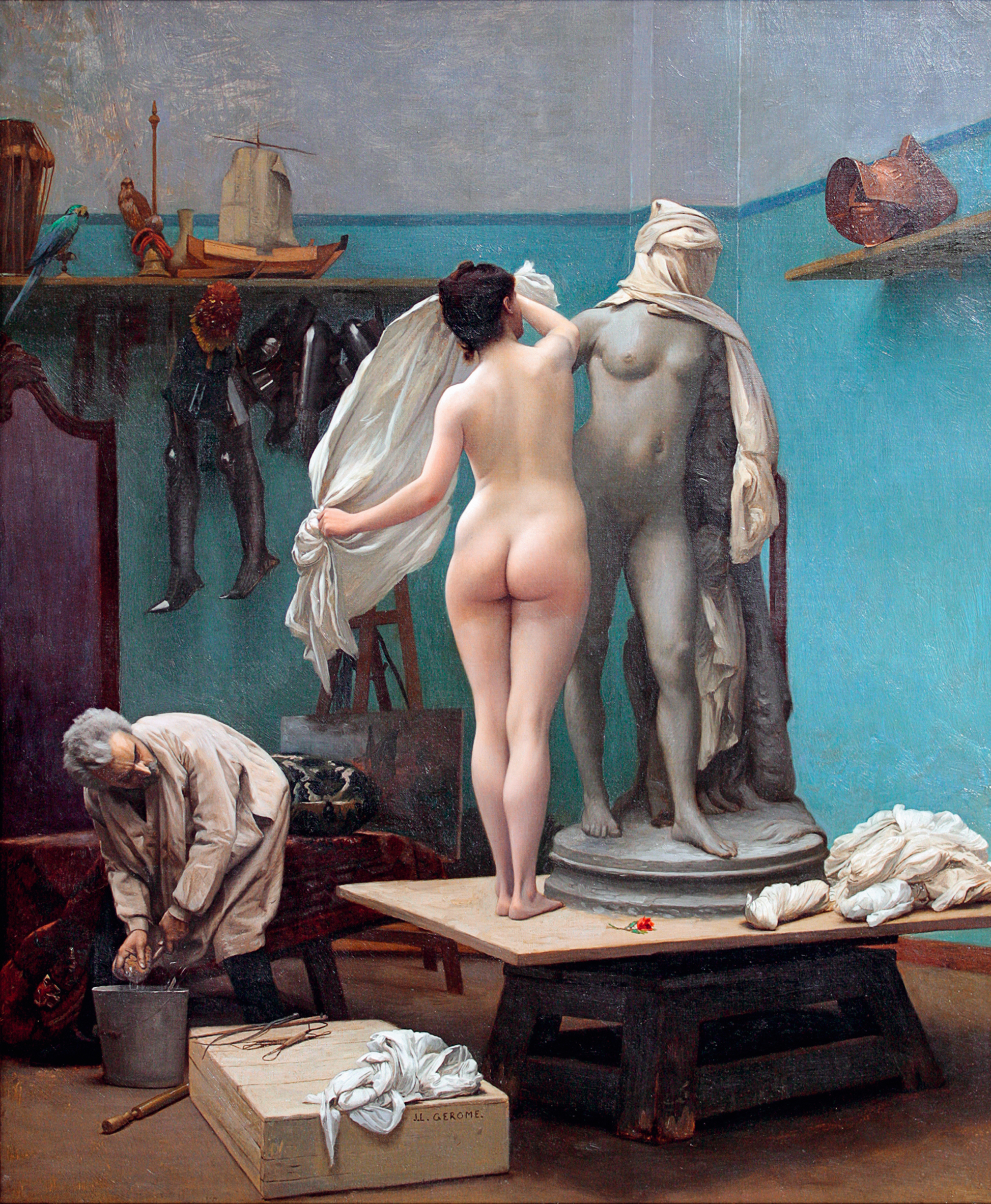
The End of the Session, 1886

== Bibliography ==
- (FR) Paul Dollfus, Modèles d'Artistes, Paris, 1890, p. 100 [Read online via Gallica] of Bibliothèque nationale de France
