= Orient =

Archaic term for the Eastern world

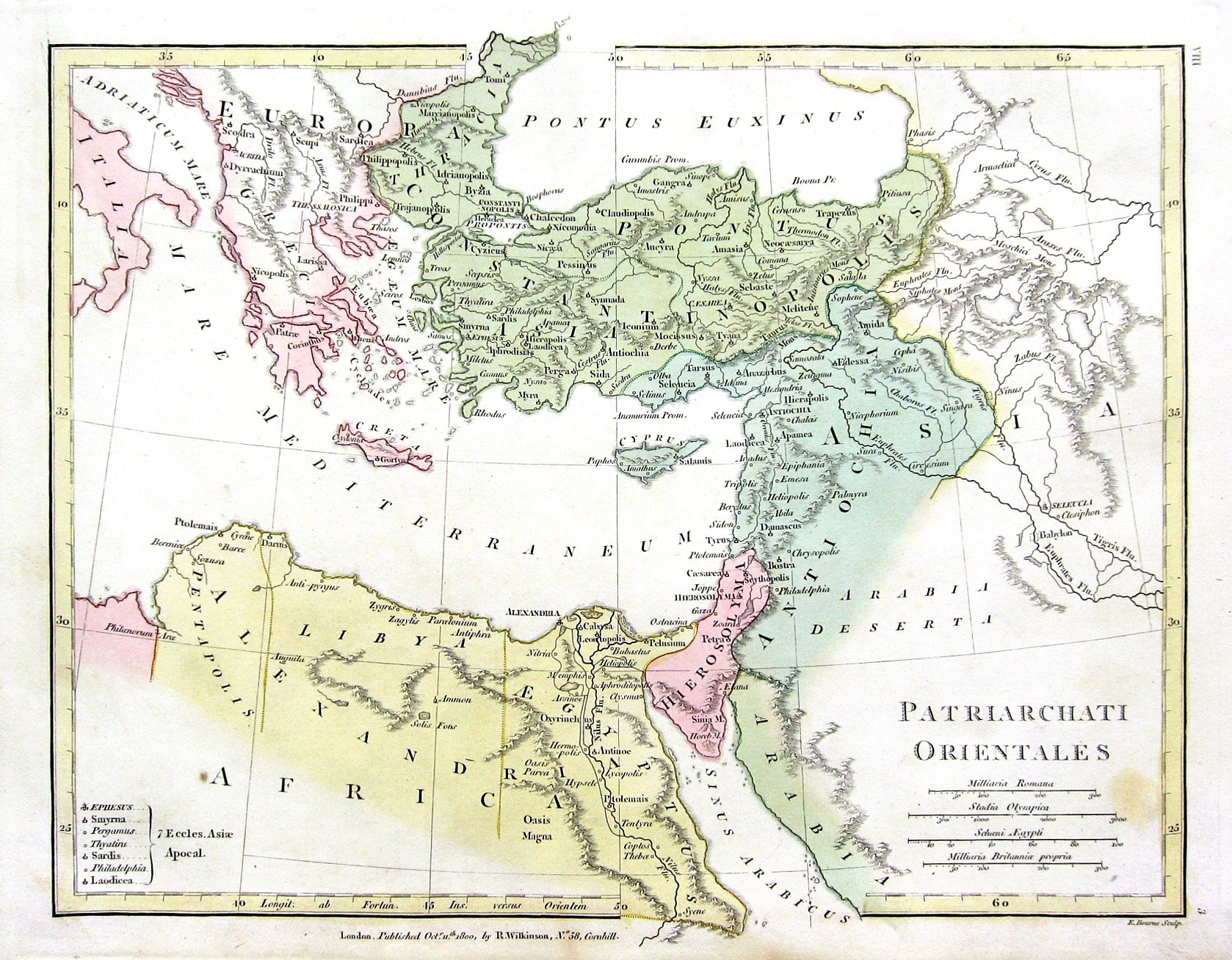
Ancient Orient of the Roman Empire and its ecclesiastical order after the Council of Chalcedon, 451

The Orient is a term referring to the East in relation to Europe, traditionally comprising anything belonging to the Eastern world. It is the antonym of the term Occident, which refers to the Western world.

In English, it is largely a metonym for, and coterminous with, the continent of Asia – loosely classified into Southwest Asia, Southeast Asia, South Asia, Central Asia, East Asia, and sometimes including the Caucasus. Originally, the term Orient was used to designate only the Near East, but later its meaning evolved and expanded, designating also Central Asia, Southwest Asia, South Asia, Southeast Asia, or the Far East.

In the USA the term oriental is a dated term which was often used to describe objects and people coming from the Orient/eastern Asia.

== Etymology ==
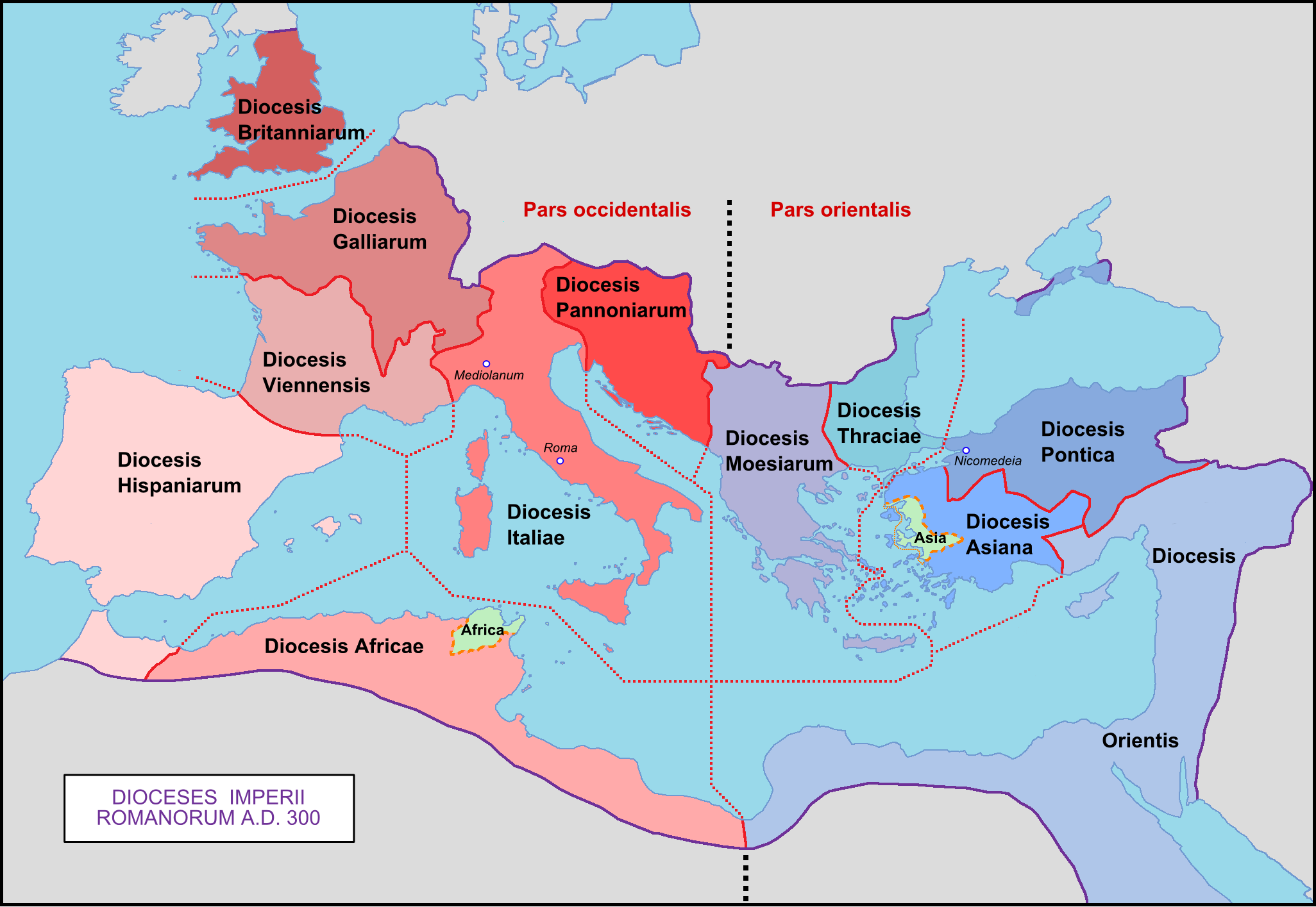
Administrative Dioceses of the Roman Empire, c. 300, including the original Diocese of the Orient

The term "Orient" derives from the Latin word oriens, meaning "east" (lit. "rising" < orior "rise"). The use of the word for "rising" to refer to the east (where the sun rises) has analogues from many languages: compare the terms "Arevelk" in Armenian: Արեւելք (Armenian Arevelk means "East" or "Sunrise"), "Levant" (< French levant "rising"), "Vostok" Russian: Восток (< Russian voskhod Russian: восход "sunrise"), "Anatolia" (< Greek anatole), "mizrah" in Hebrew ("zriha" meaning sunrise), "sharq" Arabic: شرق (< Arabic yashriq يشرق "rise", shurūq Arabic: شروق "rising"), "shygys" Kazakh: шығыс (< Kazakh shygu Kazakh: шығу "come out"), Turkish: doğu (< Turkish doğmak to be born; to rise), "xavar" Persian: خاور (meaning east), Chinese: 東 (pinyin: dōng, a pictograph of the sun rising behind a tree) and "The Land of the Rising Sun" to refer to Japan. In Arabic, the Mashriq literally means "the sunrise", "the east", the name is derived from the verb sharaqa (Arabic: شرق "to shine, illuminate, radiate" and "to rise"), from sh-r-q root (ش-ر-ق), referring to the east, where the sun rises. Historically, the Mashriq was the southern part of the Eastern Roman Empire.

Many ancient temples, including pagan temples, Hindu temples, Buddhist temples, Jain temples, and the Jewish Temple in Jerusalem, were built with their main entrances facing the East. This tradition was carried on in Christian churches.

The opposite term "Occident" derives from the Latin word occidens, meaning west (lit. setting < occidere "fall/set"). This term meant the west (where the sun sets) but has fallen into disuse in English, in favour of "Western world".

== History of the term ==
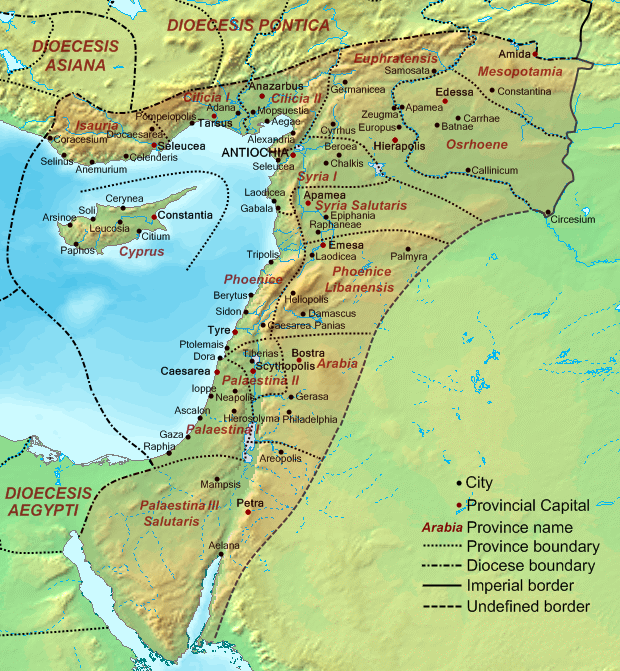
Late Roman Diocese of the Orient, c. 400

Territorialization of the Roman term Orient occurred during the reign of emperor Diocletian (284–305), when the Diocese of the Orient (Latin: Dioecesis Orientis) was formed. Later in the 4th century, the Praetorian prefecture of the Orient (Latin: Praefectura Praetorio Orientis) was also formed, including most of the Eastern Roman Empire, from the Thrace eastwards; its easternmost part was the original Diocese of the Orient, corresponding roughly to the region of Syria.

Over time, the common understanding of "the Orient" has continually shifted eastwards, as European people travelled farther into Asia. It finally reached the Pacific Ocean, in what Westerners came to call "the Far East". These shifts in time and identification sometimes confuse the scope (historical and geographic) of Oriental Studies. Yet there remain contexts where "the Orient" and "Oriental" have kept their older meanings (e.g., "Oriental spices" typically are from the regions extending from the Middle East to sub-continental India to Indo-China). Until 2009, travellers could take the Orient Express train from Paris to its terminus in the European part of Istanbul, a route established in the early 20th century.

In European historiography, the meaning of "the Orient" changed in scope several times. Originally, the term referred to Egypt, the Levant, and adjoining areas as far west as Morocco. During the 1800s, India, and to a lesser extent China, began to displace the Levant as the primary subject of Orientalist research, while the term also appears in mid-century works to describe an appearance or perceived similarity to "Oriental" government or culture, such as in Tolstoy's 1869 novel War and Peace, in which Napoleon, upon seeing the "oriental beauty" of Moscow, calls it "That Asiatic city of the innumerable churches, holy Moscow!", while in 1843 the American historian William Prescott uses the phrase "barbaric pomp, truly Oriental" to describe the court life of Aztec nobility in his history of the conquest of the Aztec Empire. As late as 1957 Karl Wittfogel included Rome and the Incan Empire in his study of what he called Oriental Despotism, demonstrating the term still carries a meaning in Western thought that transcends geography. By the mid-20th century, Western scholars generally considered "the Orient" as just East Asia, Southeast Asia, and eastern Central Asia. As recently as the early 20th century, the term "Orient" often continued to be used in ways that included North Africa. Today, the term primarily evokes images of China, Taiwan, Japan, Korea, Mongolia, Thailand, Vietnam, Cambodia, Laos, Malaysia, Singapore, Myanmar, Philippines, Indonesia, Timor-Leste and Brunei. "The Orient" being largely a cultural term, large parts of Asia—Siberia most notably—were excluded from the scholarly notion of "the Orient".

Equally valid terms for the Orient still exist in the English language in such collocations as Oriental studies (now Asian Studies in some countries).

The adjectival term Oriental has been used by the West to mean cultures, peoples, countries, Asian rugs, and goods from the Orient. "Oriental" means generally "eastern". It is a traditional designation (especially when capitalized) for anything belonging to the Orient or "East" (for Asia), and especially of its Eastern culture. It indicated the eastern direction in historical astronomy, often abbreviated "Ori". In contemporary American English, Oriental usually refers to things from the parts of East Asia traditionally occupied by East Asians and most Central Asians and Southeast Asians racially categorized as "Mongoloid". This excludes Jews, Indians, Arabs, and most other South or West Asian peoples. Because of historical discrimination against Chinese, Korean and Japanese, in some parts of the United States, some people consider the term derogatory. For example, Washington State prohibits the word "Oriental" in legislation and government documents and prefers the word "Asian" instead.

In more local uses, "oriental" is also used for eastern parts of countries such as Morocco's Oriental Region. "Oriental" may also be used as a synonym of "eastern", especially in Romance languages. Examples include the "oriental" and "occidental" provinces of Mindoro and Negros in the Philippines, and the French département of Pyrénées-Orientales. Between 1830 and 1962 the French Army used the term tenue orientale in reference to the distinctive indigenous uniforms of the various regiments (spahis, zouaves and tirailleurs) recruited in Algeria, Morocco and Tunisia.

Since the 19th century, "orientalist" has been the traditional term for a scholar of Oriental studies; however, the use in English of "Orientalism" to describe academic "Oriental studies" is rare: the Oxford English Dictionary cites only one such usage, by Lord Byron in 1812. "Orientalism" is more widely used to refer to the works of the many 19th-century artists who specialized in "Oriental" subjects and often drew on their travels to North Africa and Western Asia. Artists, as well as scholars, were already described as "Orientalists" in the 19th century. In 1978, the Palestinian-American scholar Edward Said published his influential and controversial book, Orientalism, and used the term to describe a pervasive Western tradition, both academic and artistic, of prejudiced outsider interpretations of the Arab and Muslim worlds that has been shaped by the attitudes of European imperialism in the 18th and the 19th centuries.

== Current usage ==
=== British English ===
In British English, the term Oriental is sometimes still used to refer to people from East and Southeast Asia (such as those from China, Taiwan, Japan, Korea, Mongolia, Thailand, Vietnam, Cambodia, Laos, Malaysia, Singapore, Myanmar, Philippines, Indonesia, Timor-Leste and Brunei). Judges in the United Kingdom have been issued with guidelines to encourage political correctness where oriental should be avoided because it is imprecise and may be considered racist or offensive. Oriental is still a common name for Chinese takeaways and traditional chip shops in Britain.

"Asian" in Great Britain usually refers to people who come specifically from South Asia (in particular Pakistan, India, Bangladesh, Sri Lanka, Nepal, Maldives, Bhutan, and Afghanistan), since British Asians as a whole make up approximately 9.3% of the population within the United Kingdom, and people of an ethnically South Asian background comprise the largest group within this category. "Orientals" refers exclusively to people of East and Southeast Asian origin, who constitute approximately 0.7% of the UK population as a whole. Of these, the majority are of Chinese descent. Orient is also a word for the lustre of a fine pearl. Hong Kong, a former British colony, has been called "Pearl of the Orient" along with Shanghai. In the UK, and much of the commonwealth, it is not considered a pejorative term, with many East Asian people choosing to use it themselves - notably in the names of East Asian businesses such as restaurants and takeaway outlets.

People in the United Kingdom from Southwest Asia, Asia Minor and Near East are often referred to by the term "Middle Eastern". These can include Arabs, Kurds, Turks, Assyrians, West Asian Armenians, Yezidis, Egyptians (including Copts), Mandaeans, among others.

In some specific contexts, for example the carpet and rug trade, the older sense of "oriental" to cover not just East Asia but Central Asia, South Asia and Turkey may still be used; an Oriental rug may come from any of these areas.

=== American English ===
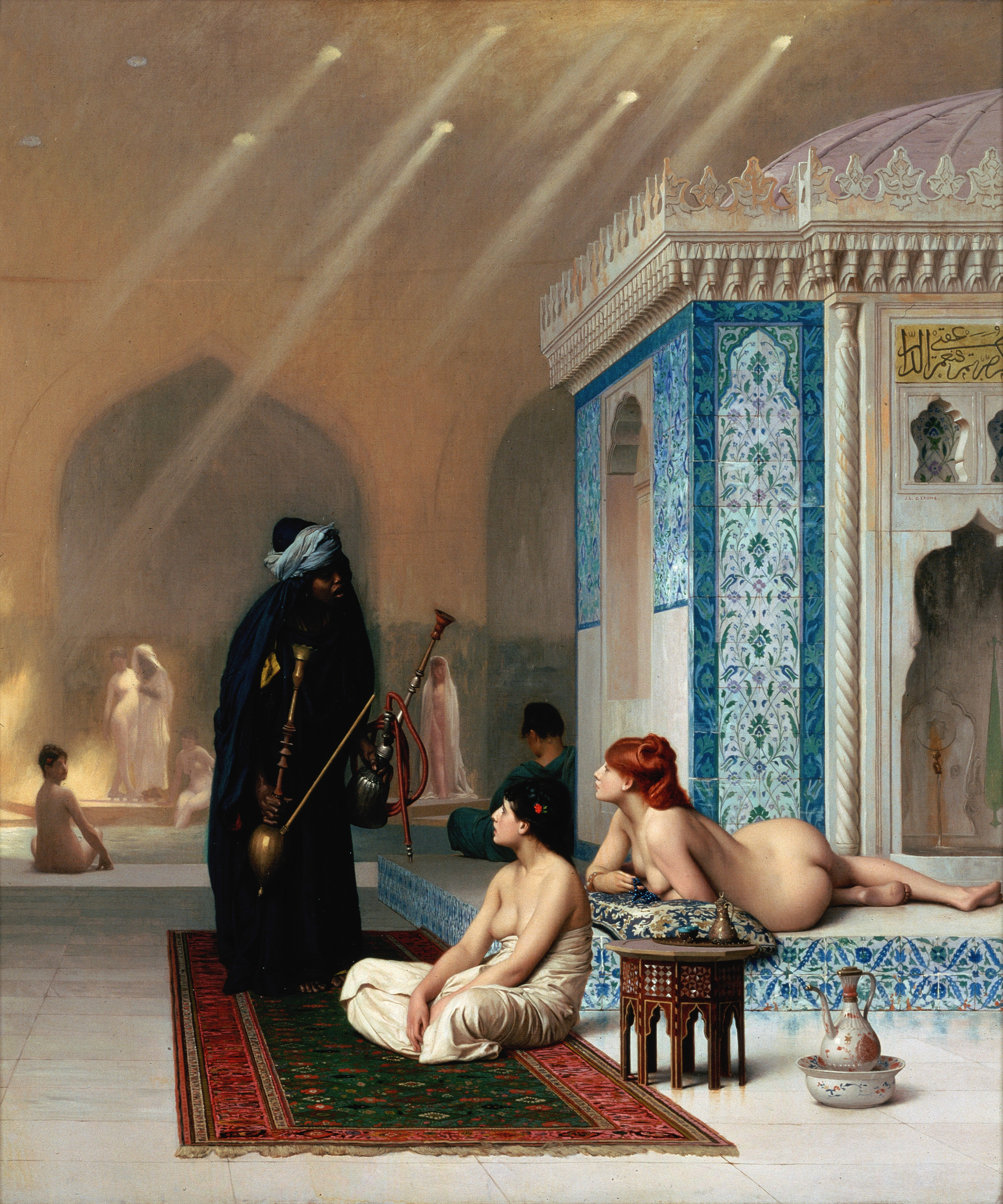
Pool in a Harem by the Orientalist painter Jean-Léon Gérôme c. 1876; nude women in harem or bathing settings are a staple of much Orientalist painting

The term Oriental may sound dated or even be seen as a pejorative, particularly when used as a noun. John Kuo Wei Tchen, director of the Asian/Pacific/American Studies Program and Institute at New York University, said the basic criticism of the term began in the U.S. during a cultural shift in the 1970s. He has said: "With the U.S.A. anti-war movement in the '60s and early '70s, many Asian Americans identified the term 'Oriental' with a Western process of racializing Asians as forever opposite 'others'", by making a distinction between "Western" and "Eastern" ancestral origins.

This is particularly relevant when referring to lands and peoples not associated with the historic "Orient": outside of the former Byzantine (Eastern Roman) Empire and Sasanian Empire (Persia), including the former Diocese of the Orient, as well as others lands sharing cultural legacies with the Oriental Orthodox churches and Oriental Catholic Churches. In contrast, regions of Asia further East, outside of the cultural domination of Abrahamic religions, do not share these same historical associations, giving way for the term "oriental" to have different connotations.

In 2016, President Obama signed New York Congresswoman Grace Meng's legislation H.R. 4238 replacing the word with Asian American in federal law.

=== China ===
The Chinese word dongfang or tungfang (东方; 東方; dōngfāng; Wade–Giles: tung¹fang¹) is translated as "oriental" in the official English names of several entities, e.g. Oriental Art Center, Oriental Movie Metropolis. In other cases, the same word is more literally translated as "eastern", e.g. China Eastern Airlines.

=== Uruguay ===
The official name of Uruguay is Oriental Republic of Uruguay; the adjective Oriental refers to the geographic location of the country, east of the Uruguay River.

The term Oriental is also used as Uruguay's demonym, usually with a formal or solemn connotation. The word also has a deep historical meaning as a result of its prolonged use in the region, since the 18th century it was used in reference to the inhabitants of the Banda Oriental, the historical name of the territories that now compose the modern nation of Uruguay.

=== German ===
In German, Orient is usually used synonymously with the area between the Near East and East Asia, including Israel, the Arab world, and Greater Persia.

The term Asiaten (English: Asians) means Asian people in general. Another word for Orient in German is Morgenland (now mainly poetic), which literally translates as "morning land". The antonym "Abendland" (rarely: "Okzident") is also mainly poetic, and refers to (Western) Europe.

== See also ==
- Orientalizing period of Archaic Greek art
