= The End of the Session =

Painting by Jean-Léon Gérôme

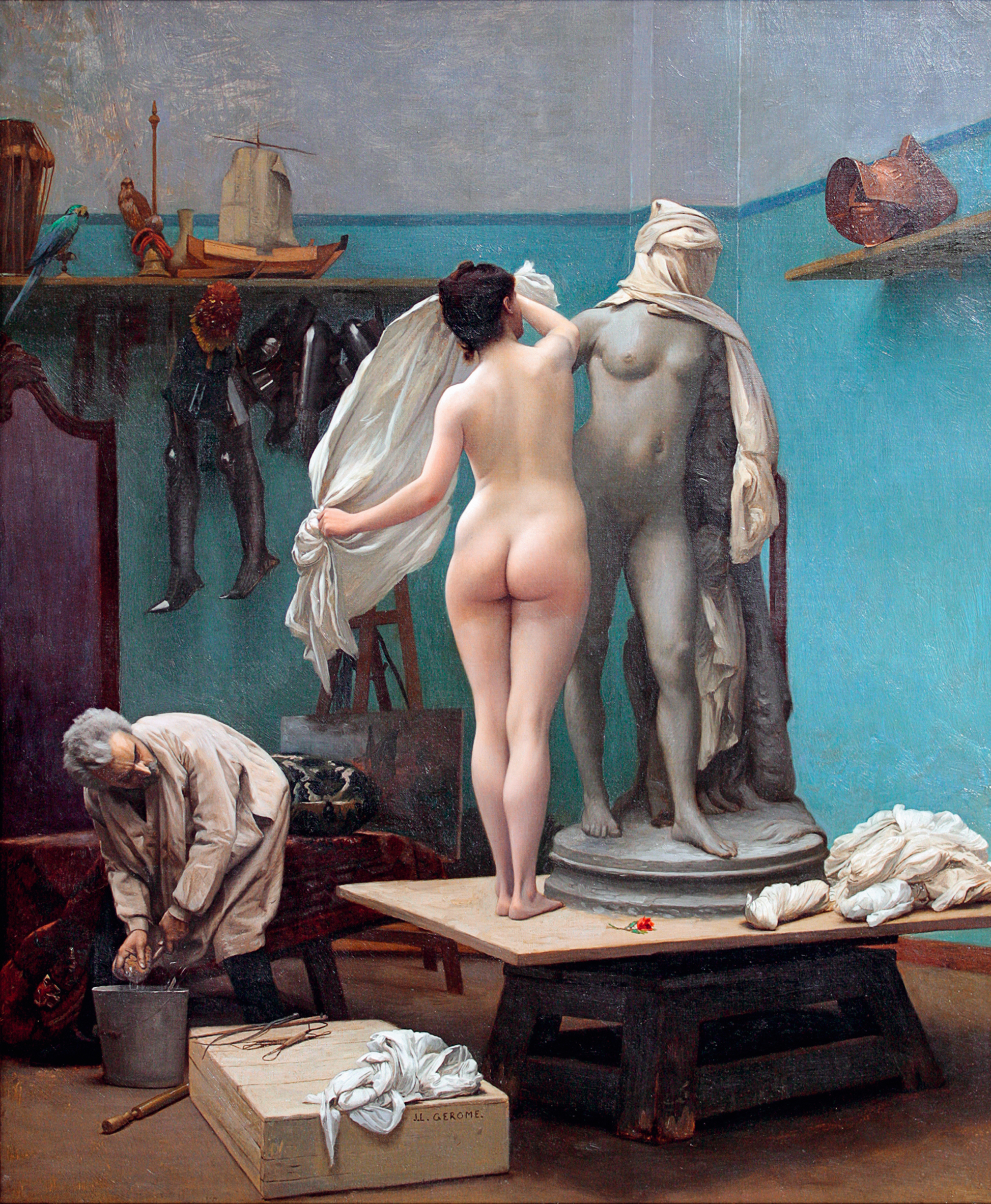
- Artist: Jean-Léon Gérôme
- Year: 1886
- Medium: Oil on canvas, nude art
- Dimensions: 33 cm × 27.4 cm (13 in × 10.8 in)
- Location: Private collection

The End of the Session (French: La Fin de la Séance) is an 1886 oil painting by the French artist Jean-Léon Gérôme. It was inspired by his creation of the sculpture Omphale. It depicts a self-portrait of Gérôme along with the model Emma Dupont in his studio. At the end of one of their sessions of sculpting, the naked Dupont is throwing a cover over the statue to protect it.

He later produced similar paintings showing his creation of the statue Tanagra. Also featuring Dupont, they reference the Pygmalion myth.

== Bibliography ==
- Allan, Scott & Morton, Mary G. Reconsidering Gérôme. Getty Publications, 2010.
- Ackerman, Gerald M. The Life and Work of Jean-Léon Gérôme. Sotheby's Publications, 1986.
- Stoichita, Victor I. The Pygmalion Effect: From Ovid to Hitchcock. University of Chicago Press, 2008.
