= Pygmalion and Galatea (Gérôme painting) =

1890 painting by Jean-Léon Gérôme

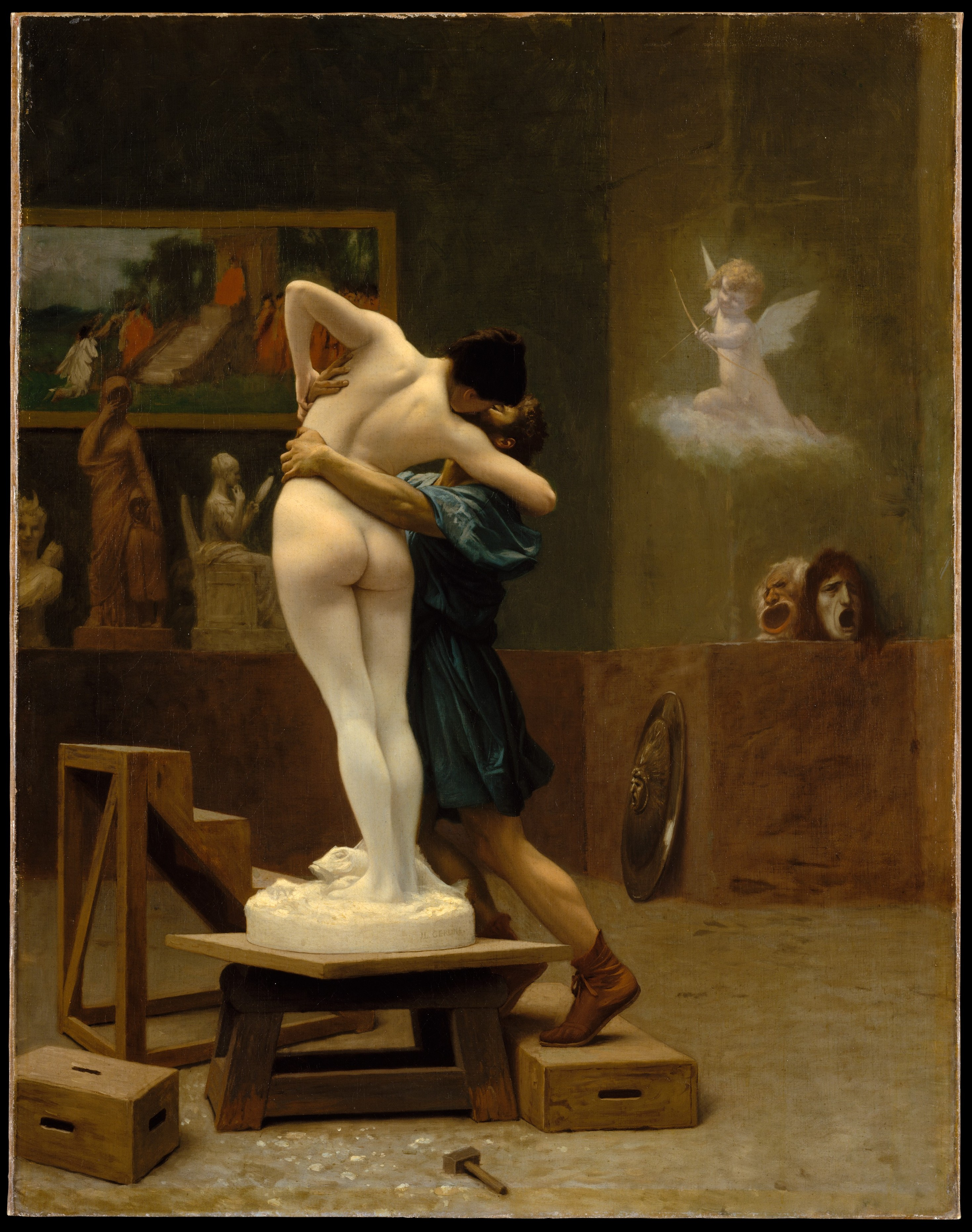
- Artist: Jean-Léon Gérôme
- Year: 1890
- Medium: Oil on canvas
- Dimensions: 89 cm × 69 cm (35 in × 27 in)
- Location: Metropolitan Museum of Art; New York City

Pygmalion and Galatea (French: Pygmalion et Galatée) is an 1890 painting by the French artist Jean-Léon Gérôme. The motif is taken from Ovid's Metamorphoses and depicts the sculptor Pygmalion kissing his statue Galatea at the moment the goddess Aphrodite brings her to life.

== Multiple versions ==
Jean-Léon Gérôme painted Pygmalion and Galatea in the summer of 1890. In 1891 he made a marble sculpture of the same subject, possibly based on a plaster version also used as model for the painting. He made several alternative versions of the painting, each presenting the subject from a different angle; the Metropolitan Museum of Art page provides a detailed history and extensive references. Different versions of the painting are seen in the backgrounds of the self-portraits The Artist and His Model (now at the Haggin Museum) and Working in Marble (Dahesh Museum of Art), in which Gérôme depicts himself sculpting Tanagra, made the same year that he painted Pygmalion and Galatea.

== Provenance ==
The most famous version, where Galatea is seen from behind, was bought by Boussod, Valadon & Cie on 22 March 1892, who sold it on 7 April, for 17,250 FFR, to Charles T. Yerkes. After his death it was sold several times until it was donated to the Metropolitan Museum of Art by Louis C. Raegner in 1927. The other versions are in private collections or lost.

== Gallery ==
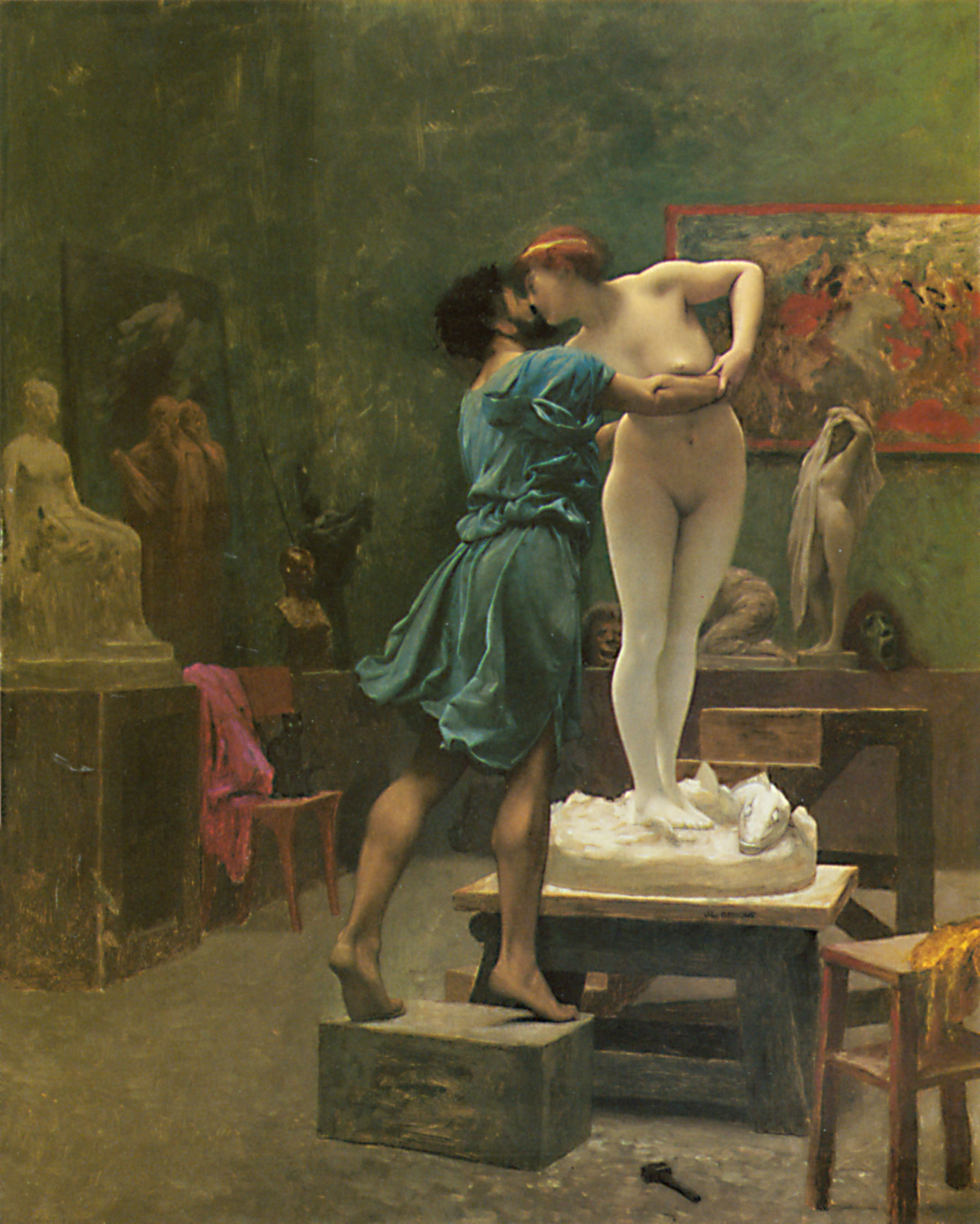
Pygmalion and Galatea, the frontal views, c. 1890

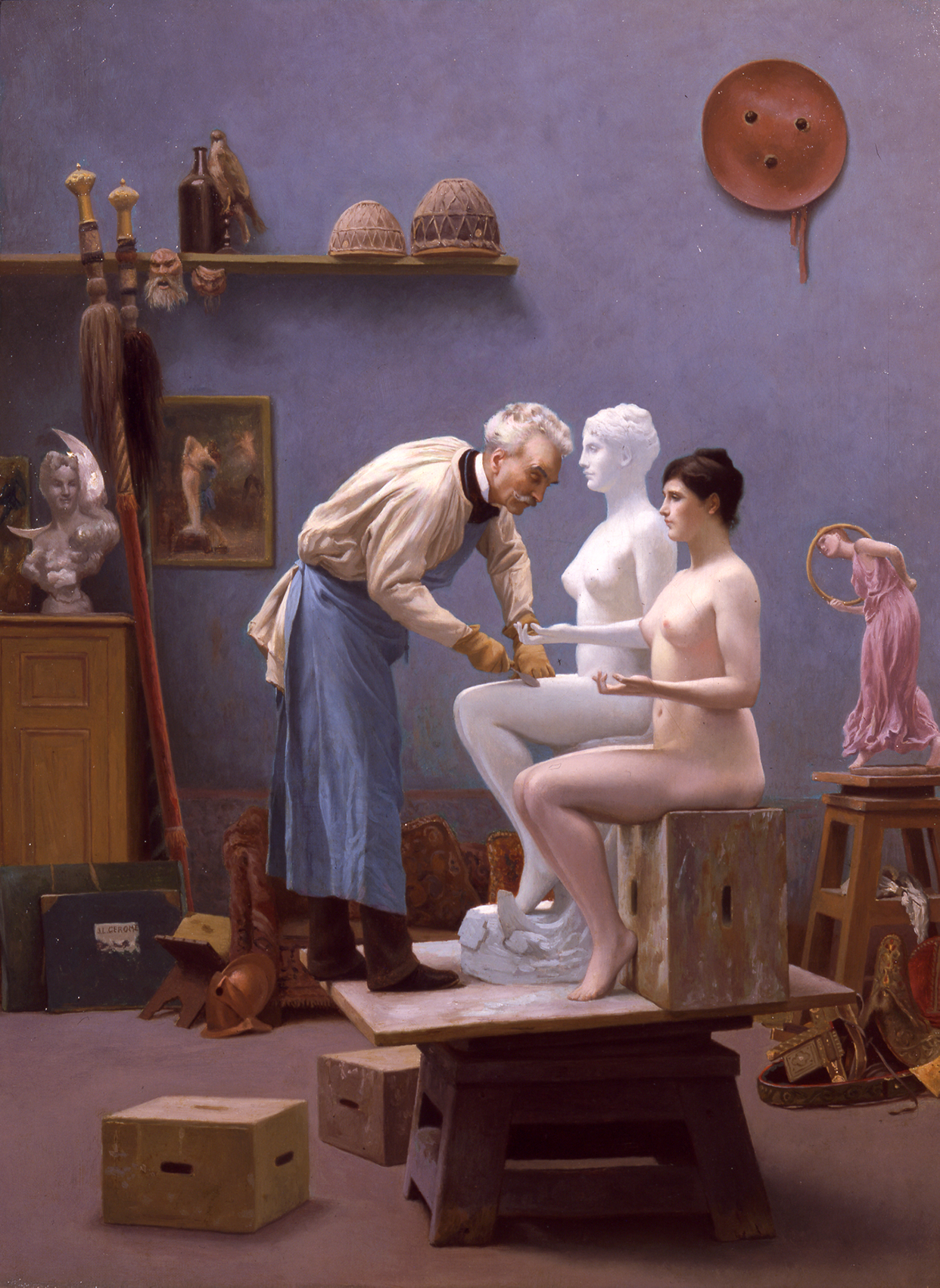
The Artist and His Model, 1894, Haggin Museum; Gérôme depicts himself sculpting Tanagra.

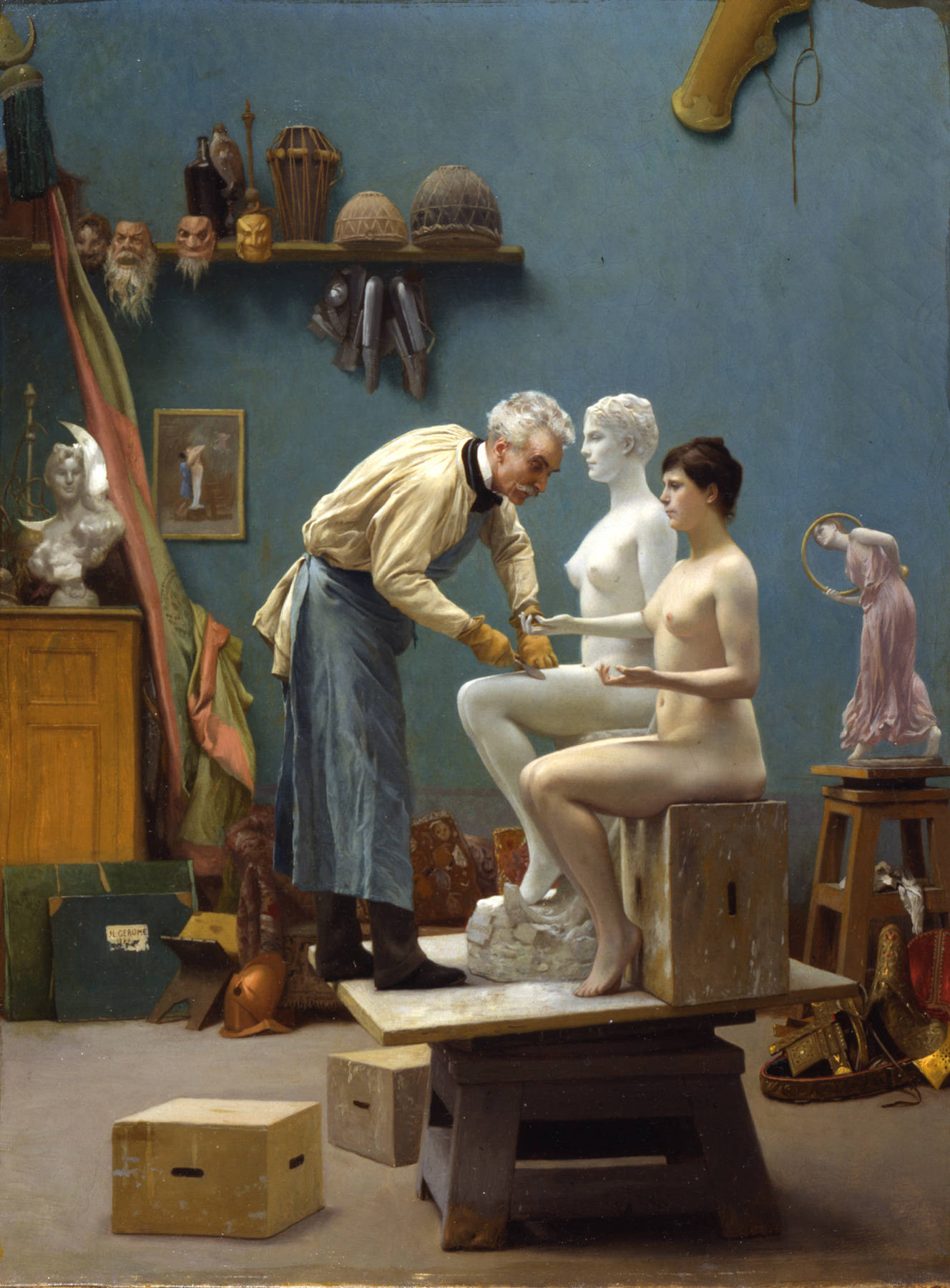
Working in Marble, 1890, Dahesh Museum of Art; Gérôme depicts himself sculpting Tanagra.

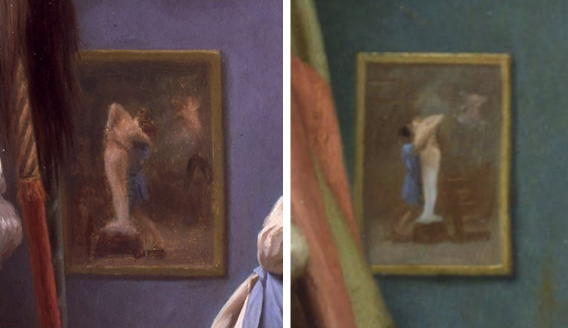
Left: Detail showing Pygmalion and Galatea in the background of The Artist and His Model. Right: detail showing a different Pygmalion and Galatea in the background of Working in Marble.

== See also ==
- Tanagra (Gérôme sculpture)
- Pygmalion and the Image series, painting series by Edward Burne-Jones
