= Omphale (Gérôme sculpture) =

Sculpture by Jean-Léon Gérôme

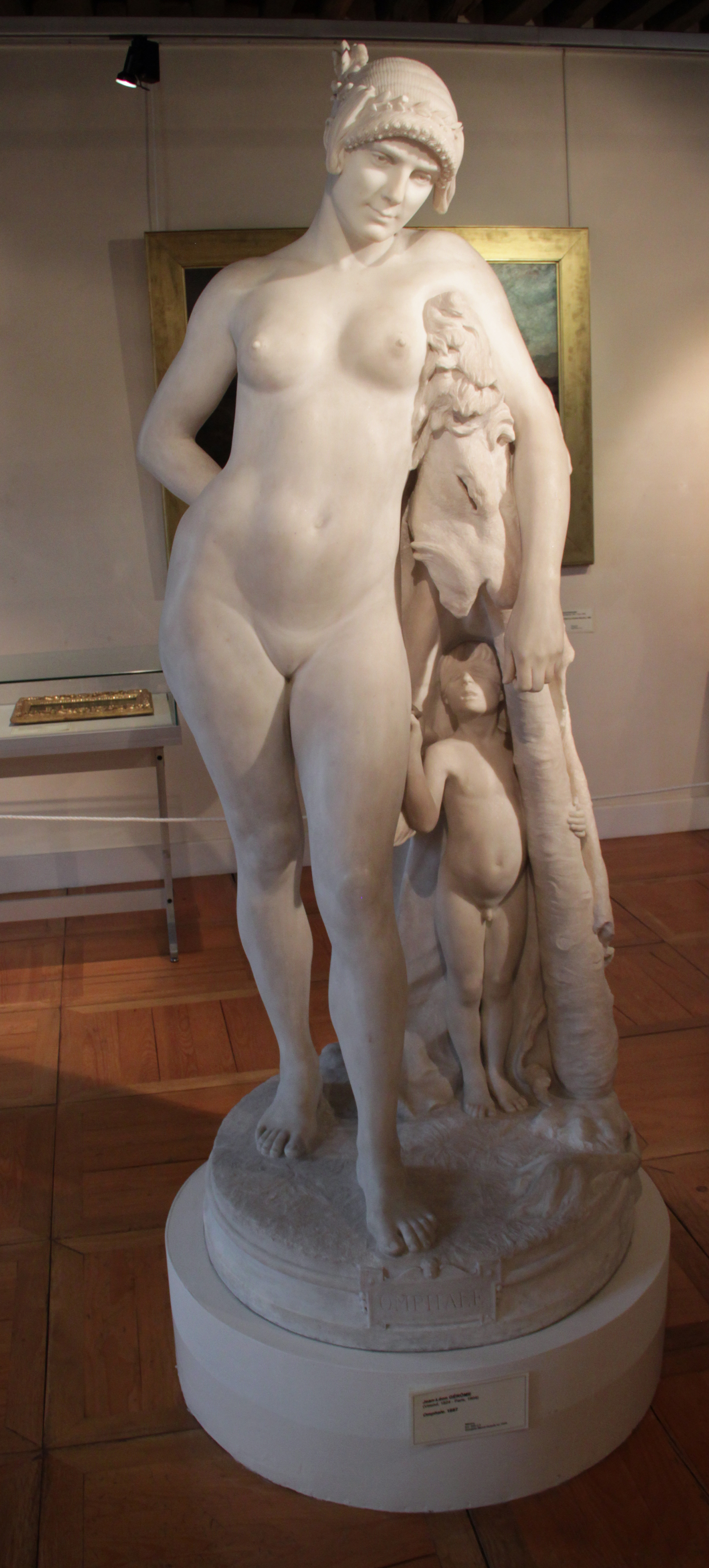
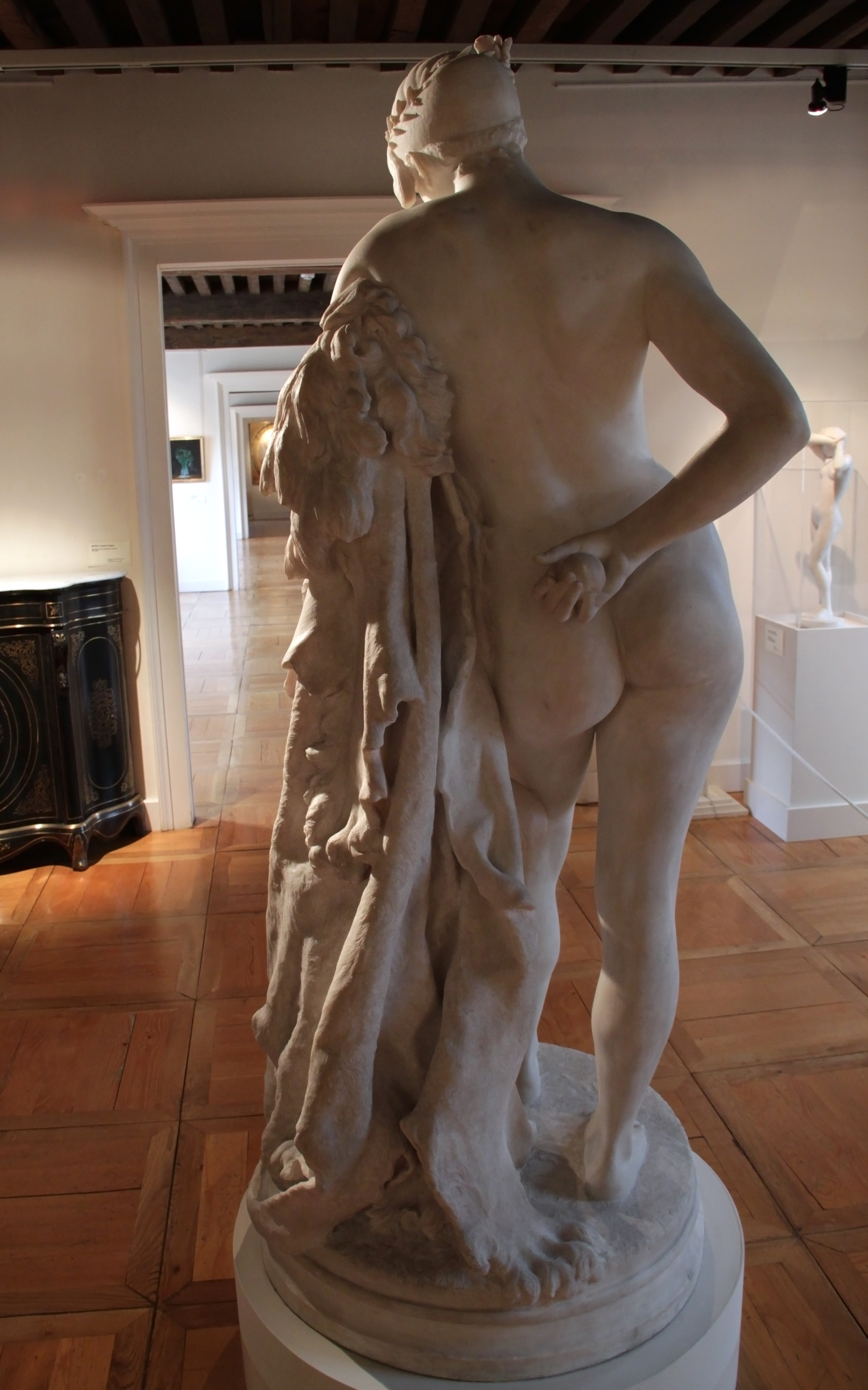
- Front view Back view
- Artist: Jean-Léon Gérôme
- Year: 18861887
- Medium: Marble sculpture
- Location: Musée Georges-Garret

Omphale is a marble sculpture by the French artist Jean-Léon Gérôme, made between 1886 and 1887, and now kept in the Musée Georges-Garret in Vesoul. A pencil sketch of the work is kept at the Dallas Museum of Art.

== History ==
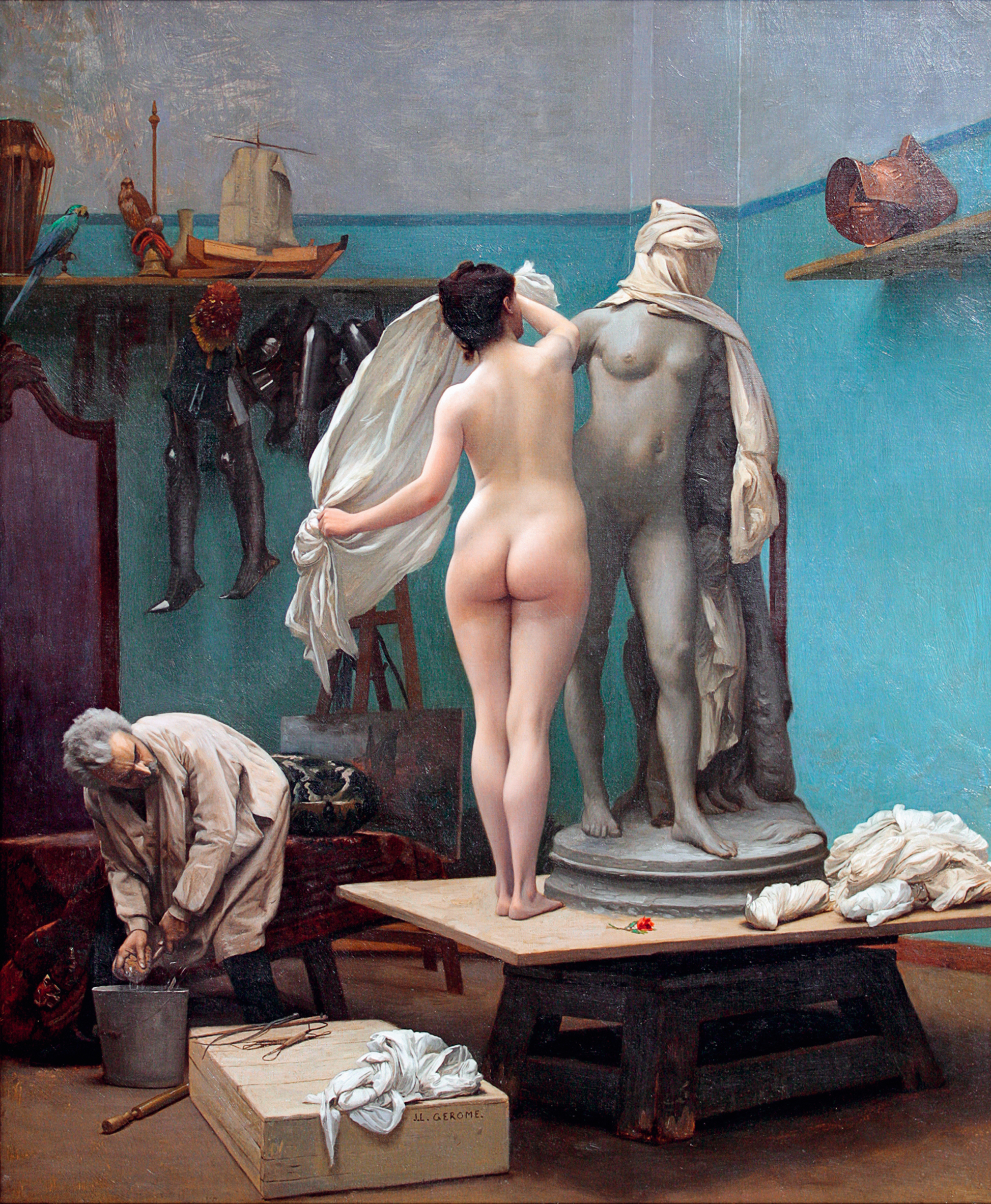
The End of the Session, 1886 painting by Gérôme. It features a self-portrait along with the model Emma Dupont and the statue

In the Salon of 1887, Omphale was the centre of attraction in the garden of the Palais de l'Industrie. Gérôme had seriously undermined his health by uninterrupted labour, having worked on the Omphale many days from seven in the morning till eleven at night.

== Appraisal ==
Fanny Field Hering describes the sculpture thus:

Pure, pensive, passionate the perfection of form and expression—she leans, in the attitude of the Farnese Hercules, upon the club of that vanquished hero, who has succumbed to the power of the tiny God of Love almost hidden under the folds of the famous lion-skin. On the lips of the beautiful Queen of Lydia rests an expression of mingled triumph and longing, as if she were not quite sure of her power to retain her captive lover.

Frédéric Masson writes of this creation: "Gérôme has found also in sculpture that which he has so long sought for and found in painting—beauty and grace. He himself has bestowed the informing idea."

== See also ==
- Academic art

== Sources ==
- Hering, Fanny Field (1892). Gérôme: The Life and Works of Jean Léon Gérôme. New York, NY: Cassell Publishing Company. pp. 38, 255–256, 275–276, 288.
- Waller, Susan (Spring 2010). "Fin de partie: A Group of Self-Portraits by Jean-Léon Gérôme". Nineteenth-Century Art Worldwide, 9(1): n.p.
- "In Focus - Jean-Léon Gérôme's Omphale". DMA Collection Online. Dallas Museum of Art. 2017. Accessed 7 July 2022.
