= Daedalium =

Human settlement in Italy

Daedalium (or Dedalium or, earlier, Omphale) was an ancient city of Magna Graecia in Sicily along the south coast road between Akragas (modern Agrigento) and Phintias (modern Licata). It was the citadel of Philaris.
