= Pool in a Harem =

Painting by Jean-Léon Gérôme

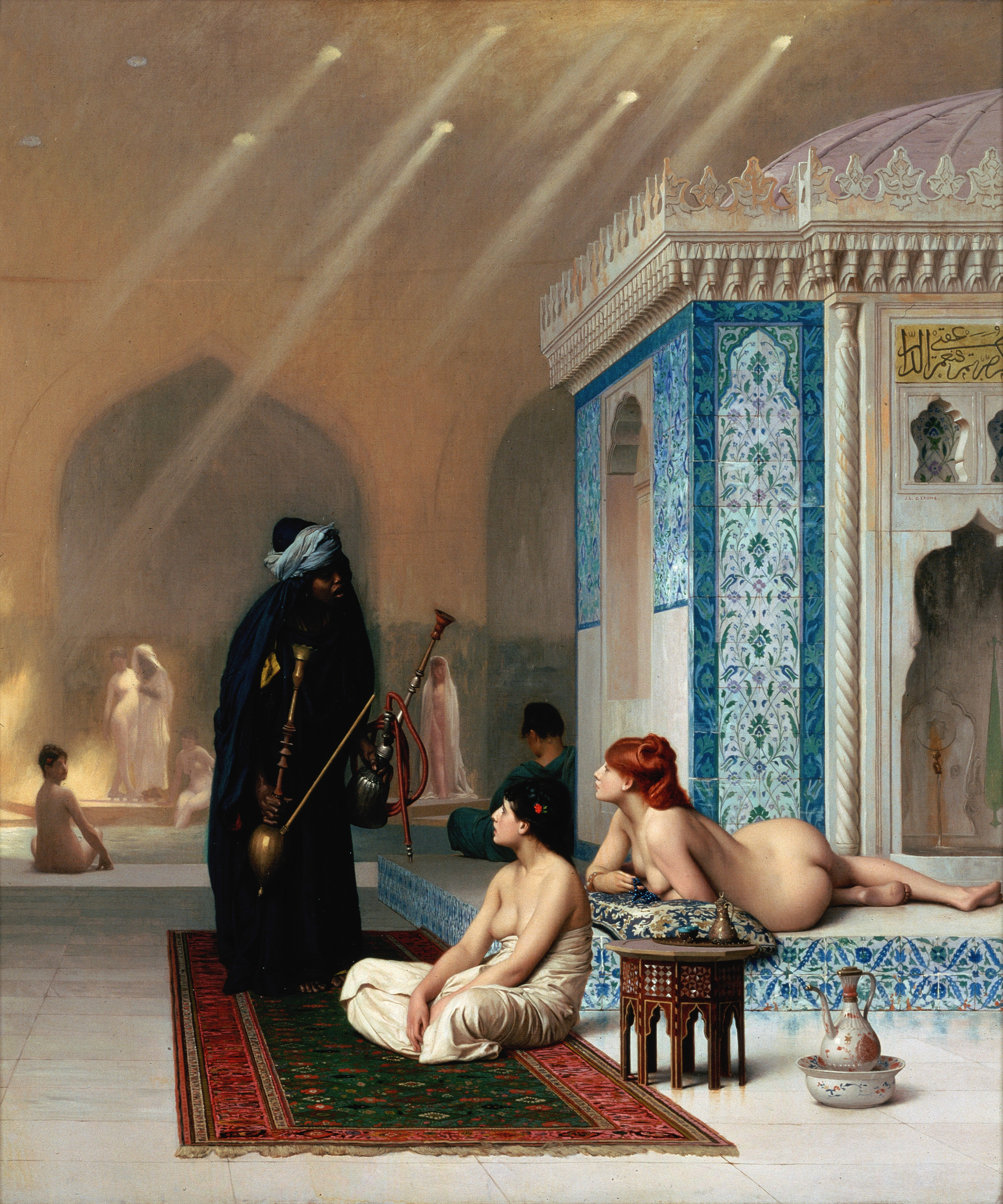
- Artist: Jean-Léon Gérôme
- Year: 1876
- Medium: Oil on canvas, academic art
- Dimensions: 73.5 cm × 62 cm (28.9 in × 24 in)
- Location: Hermitage Museum, Saint Petersburg

Pool in a Harem (French: Piscine dans un harem) is an 1876 genre painting by the French artist Jean-Léon Gérôme. It features a scene in a bathhouse in the Middle Eastern harem. Produced in the academic style popular during the era, it combines elements of nude art and orientalism. It features amongst others Emma Dupont, a regular model of Gérôme. It was exhibited at the Salon of 1876 in Paris. Today the painting is in the collection of the Hermitage Museum in Saint Petersburg.

== See also ==
- The Great Bath at Bursa, an 1883 painting by Jean-Léon Gérôme featuring a similar theme

== Bibliography ==
- Palmer, Allison Lee. Historical Dictionary of Romantic Art and Architecture. Bloomsbury Publishing, 2019.
- Peakman, Julie. Licentious Worlds: Sex and Exploitation in Global Empires. Reaktion Books, 2019.
