= Tanagra (Gérôme sculpture) =

Polychromic marble sculpture created by French artist Jean-Léon Gérôme

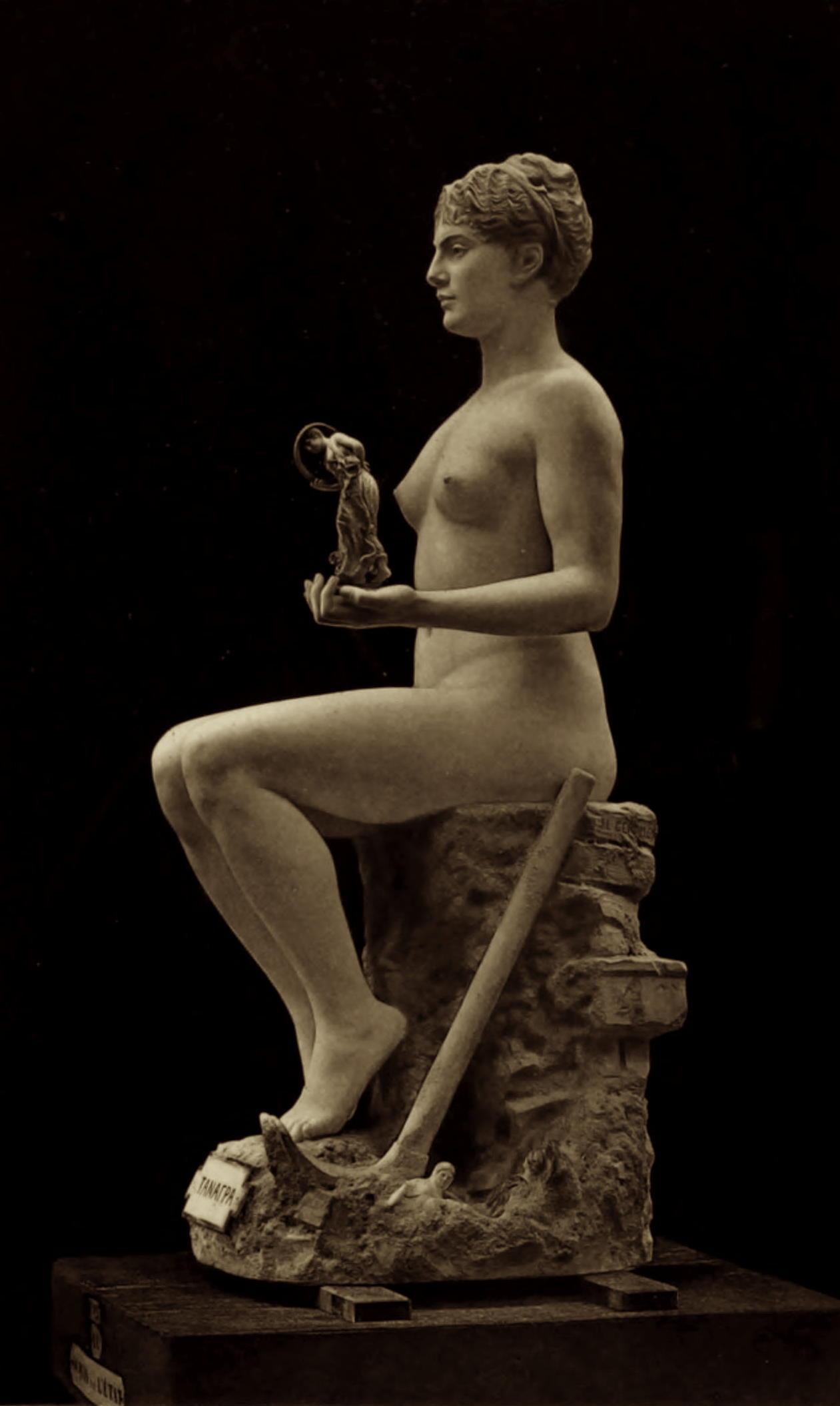
- Artist: Jean-Léon Gérôme
- Year: 1890
- Medium: polychromic marble
- Dimensions: 154.7 cm (60.9 in)
- Location: Musée d'Orsay; Paris

Tanagra is a polychromic marble sculpture created by French artist Jean-Léon Gérôme (1824–1904) as a personification of the "spirit of Tanagra," his own mythic invention tied to the Tanagra figurines from the village of that name in ancient Greece. The sculpture was first shown at the Paris Salon of 1890. Gérôme subsequently created smaller, gilded bronze versions of Tanagra; several versions of the "Hoop Dancer" figurine held by Tanagra; two paintings of an imaginary ancient Tanagra workshop; and two self-portraits of himself sculpting Tanagra from a living model in his Paris atelier. These sculptures and paintings comprise a complex, self-referential artistic program in which one of the most celebrated artists of his generation explored reception of Classical antiquity, creative inspiration, doppelgängers, and female beauty.

Tanagra is displayed at the Musée d'Orsay. Much of the polychromy has faded, and the hoop dancer is damaged (part of the hoop and right arm are missing.)

== The ancient Tanagra figurines ==
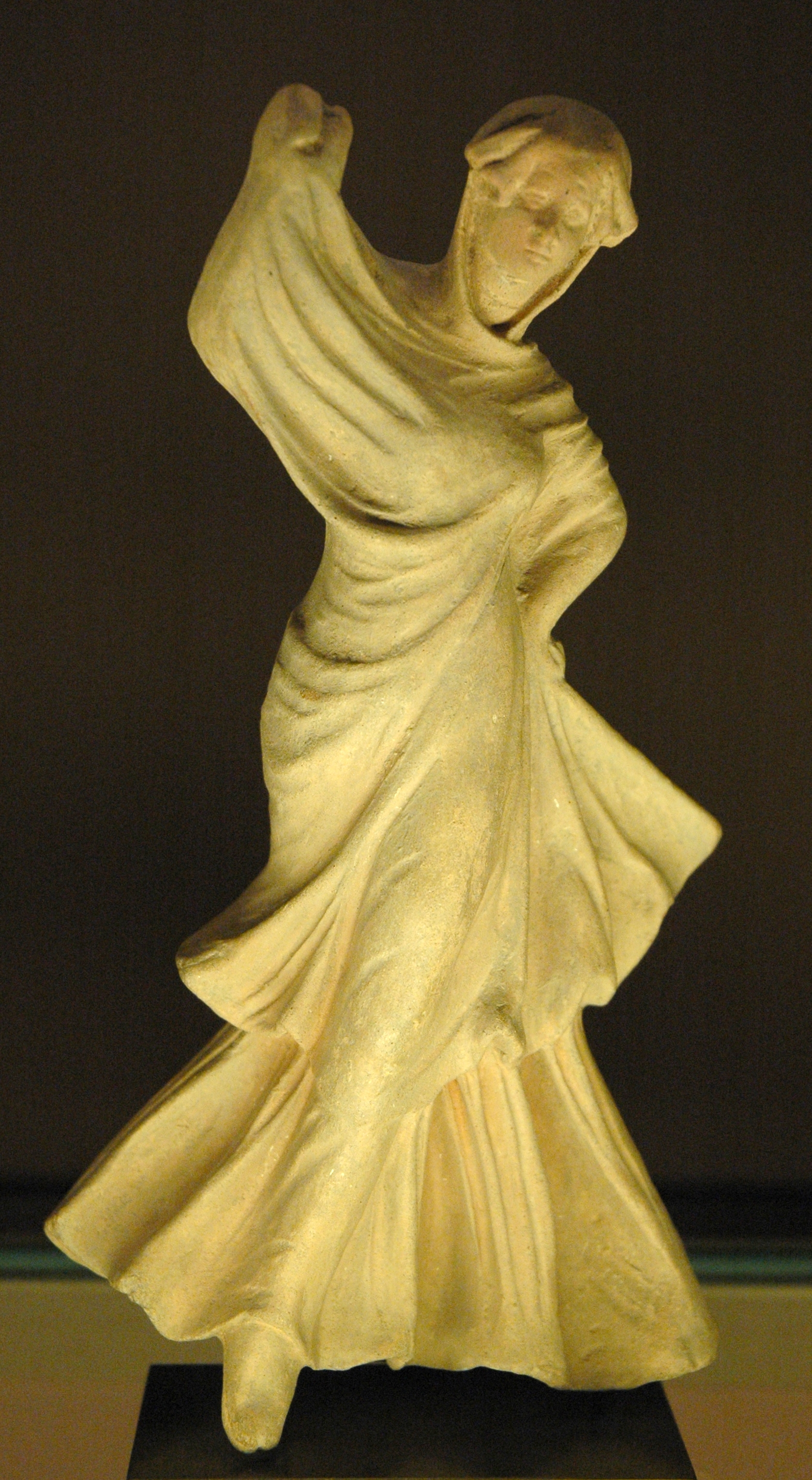
Veiled dancer, Tanagra terra cotta figure, 7 inches high, c. 150-100 B.C.E, Louvre.

In December 1870, at a site called Tanagra in Greece, archaeologists unearthed a group of Hellenistic terra cotta figurines bearing traces of original polychrome. The discovery caused a sensation, because it provided firm evidence supporting the theory that ancient sculpture was painted. The Tanagra figurines, which depicted not gods or heroes but ordinary people, were exhibited at the Exposition Universelle of 1878 in Paris, where they charmed and fascinated the public. In subsequent decades, countless forgeries flooded the art market. Tanagra figurines infiltrated popular literature and theater, as seen by references in Oscar Wilde's The Picture of Dorian Gray (1891) and An Ideal Husband (1895), and Marcel Proust's Swann's Way (1913).

== Gérôme's Tanagra ==
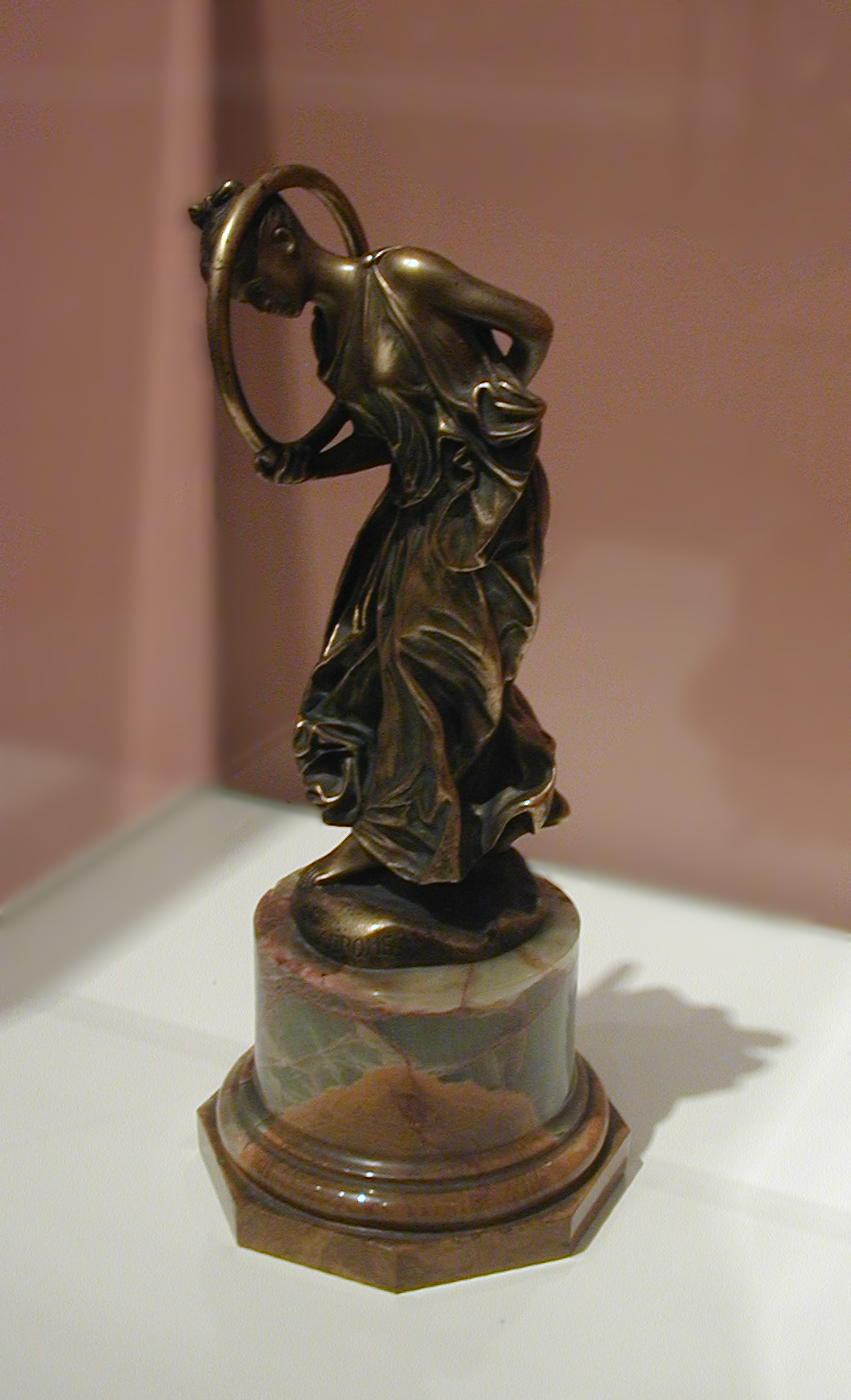
Hoop Dancer, c. 1893, by Jean-Léon Gérôme, Haggin Museum.

As a painter and sculptor, Gérôme had long drawn inspiration from the Classical world. His famous images of gladiator combats, chariot races, slave markets, the assassination of Julius Caesar, and other subjects from ancient Greece and Rome were widely influential.

In his mid-sixties, Gérôme expressed his fascination with the Tanagra figurines, and the ancients who made and owned them, with his 5-foot-high, tinted-marble Tanagra, a female nude personifying the Tyche, or presiding spirit, of the ancient city. Tanagra sits stiffly upright "atop an excavation mound. Numerous figurines have surfaced in the soil. At her feet lie the tools that allude to both the archaeological dig as well as Gérôme's role as sculptor." On the upraised palm of Tanagra's hand is a figurine of a female Hoop Dancer (Gérôme's own invention, inspired by, but not a copy of, an actual Tanagra figurine). Thus Tanagra depicts a statue holding a statue. The larger statue sits rigidly posed while the smaller is a "twirling figure, who gracefully dips her head into a golden ring clutched in her right hand and cups a golden ball in the other, as her drapery swirls around her."

"Inspired by his characteristic desire for both archaeological accuracy and realism, Gérôme delicately tinted the skin, hair, lips, and nipples of his Tanagra, causing a sensation at the Salon of 1890." A contemporary critic suggested that if the sculpture had been "secretly buried for a time, and then publicly excavated as an antique, perhaps with a broken arm, it would have turned the heads of the whole art world, and been declared in its vital characteristics and subtle anatomy a rival to the Milo Venus."

== Hoop Dancers and imaginary workshops ==
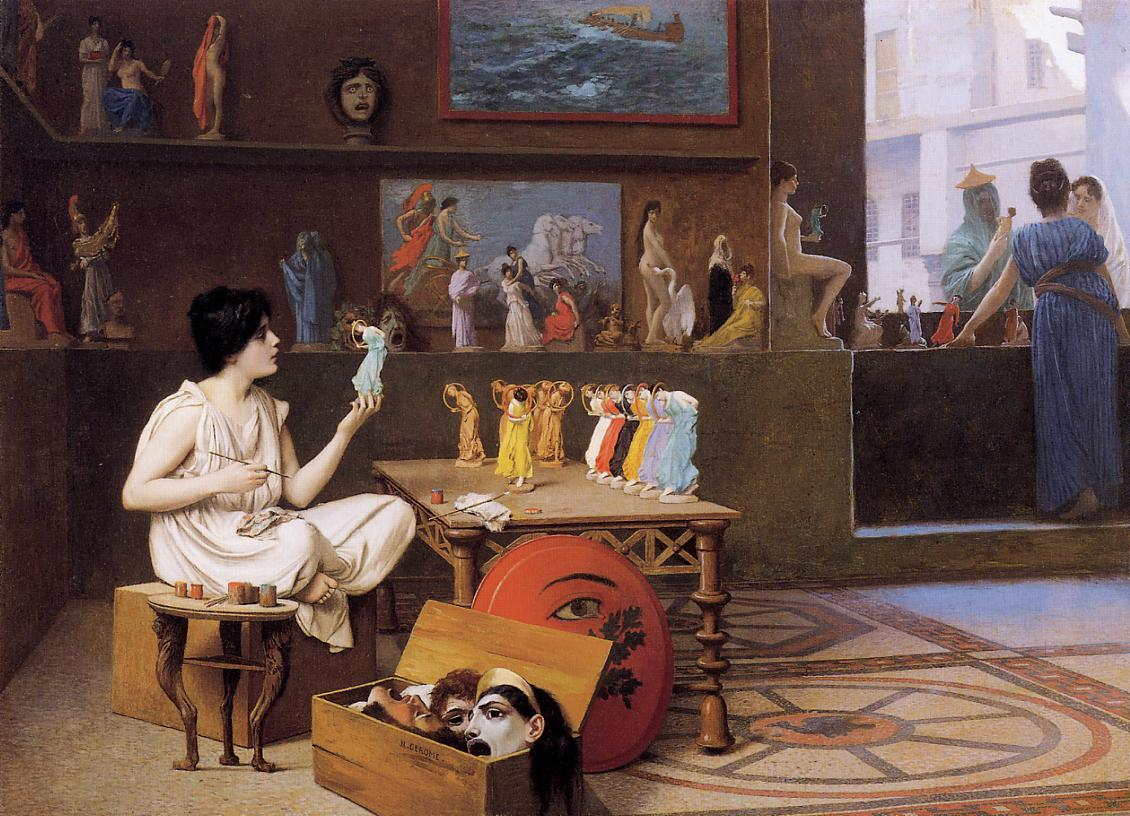
The Antique Pottery Painter: Sculpturæ vitam insufflat pictura (painting breathes life into sculpture), 1893, Art Gallery of Ontario.

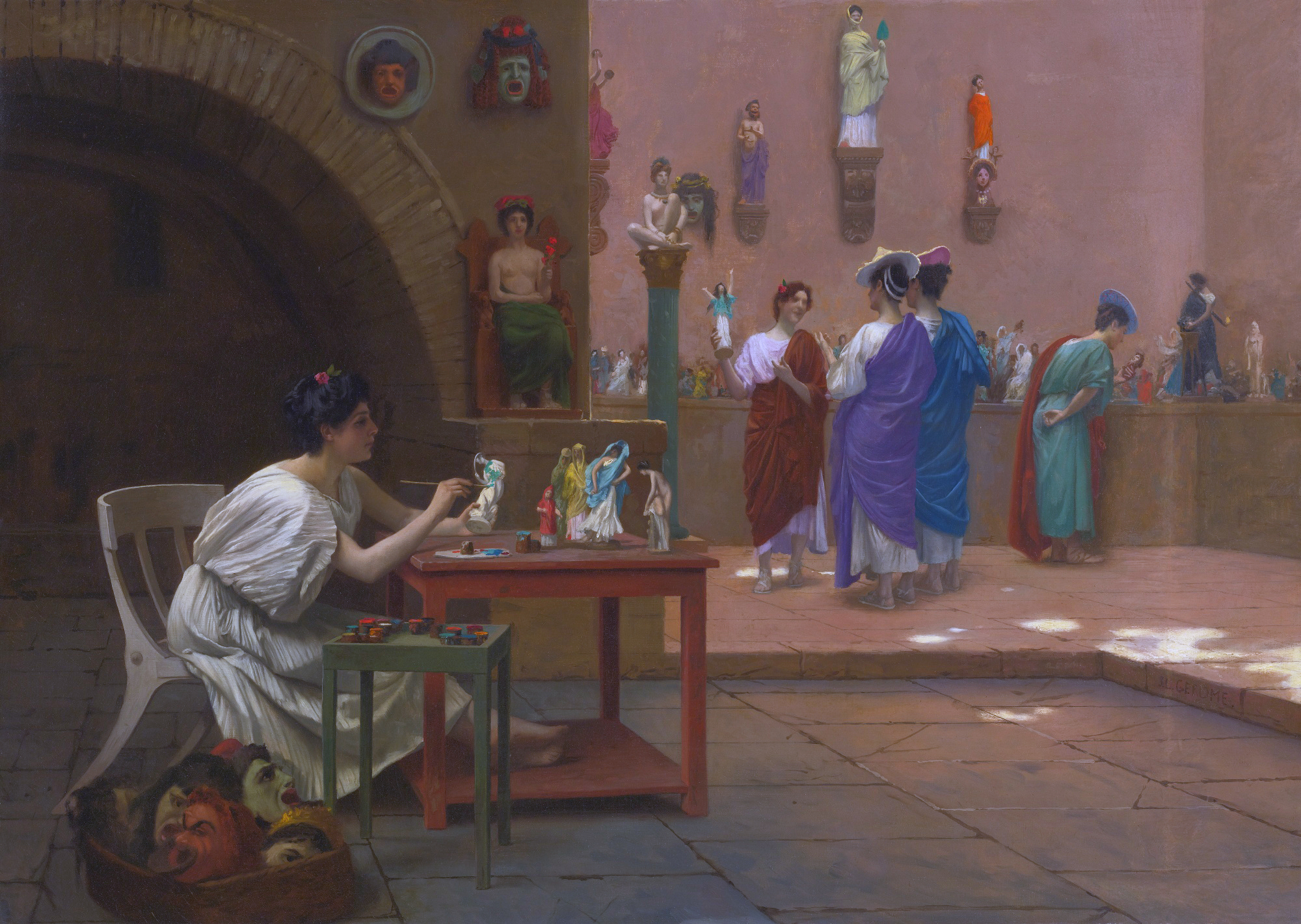
Atelier de Tanagra (Tanagra workshop), 1893, private collection; auctioned by Sotheby's in 2013 for $125,000.

Gerome would subsequently create and sell numerous copies of the Hoop Dancer figurine held by his Tanagra, making the Hoop Dancer the modern-day equivalent of a Tanagra figurine. "Here the artist is not so much breathing life into painted or sculpted flesh as reinventing for the modern age the mass-produced figurines of antiquity."

In 1893, Gérôme created two paintings of imaginary Tanagra workshops. Although Gérôme opposed the admission of female art students to the École des Beaux-Arts, both of these paintings depict a female artist who is painting copies of Gérôme's Hoop Dancer figurine (a modern anachronism retrojected back in time). These Hoop Dancers are offered for sale, along with other figurines, to browsing art-lovers (all female) who themselves resemble Tanagra figurines. In one of these paintings a smaller version of Gérôme's Tanagra presides over the sales counter, holding a Hoop Dancer in her hand. This Tanagra is a painting of a statue holding a statue. Also in this painting, the young artisan is busy "colouring an edition of 12 Hoop Dancers in various brilliant hues—a tongue-in-cheek advertisement, perhaps, made to promote the figurines that he [Gérôme] was offering for sale in two different sizes and a variety of media through his dealer and father-in-law Adolphe Goupil. The Hoop Dancer would be Gérôme's most popular and widely reproduced sculpture."

== Gérôme paints himself sculpting Tanagra, twice ==
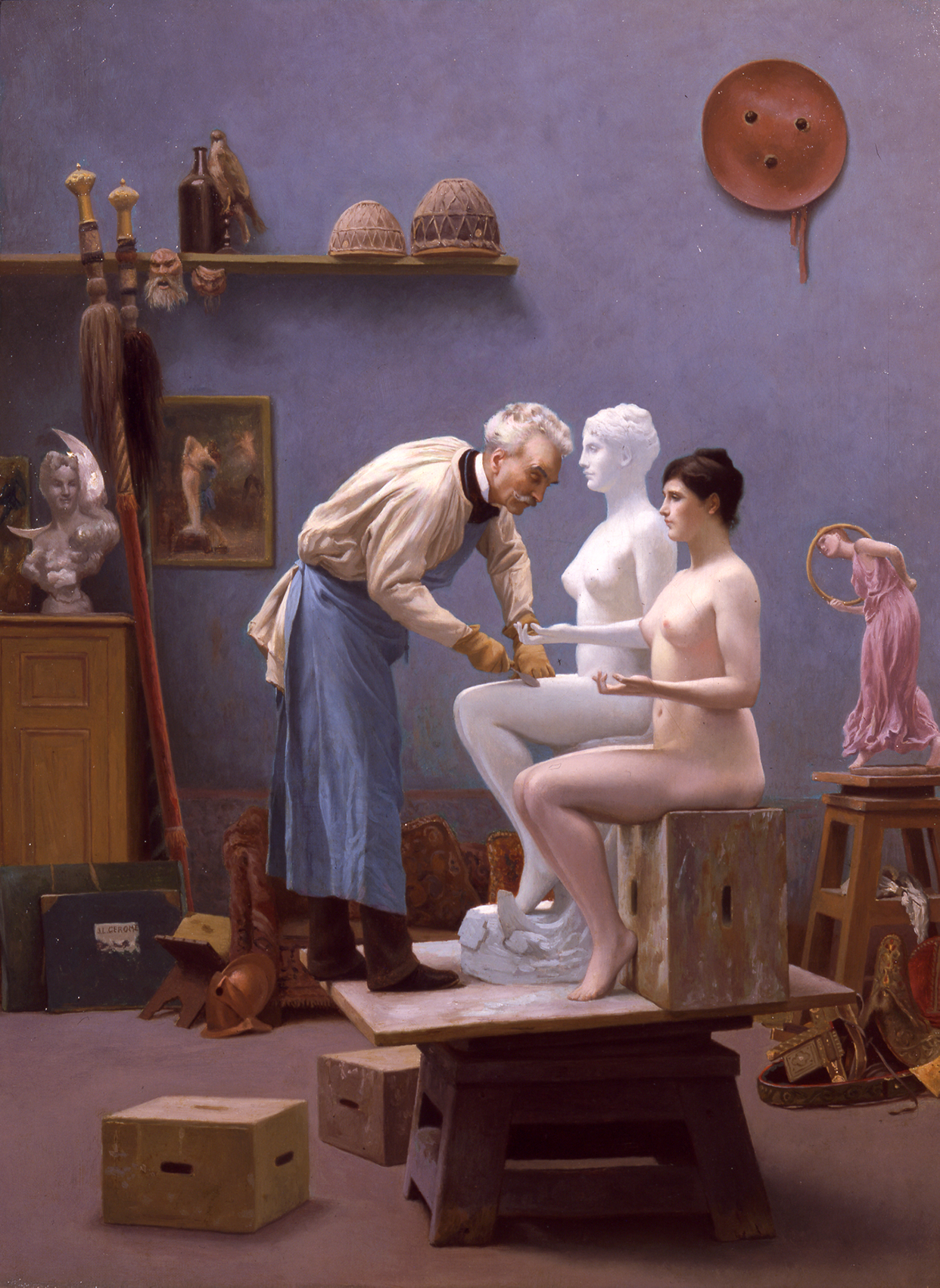
The Artist and His Model (Emma Doupont), 1894, Haggin Museum; Gérôme depicts himself sculpting Tanagra.

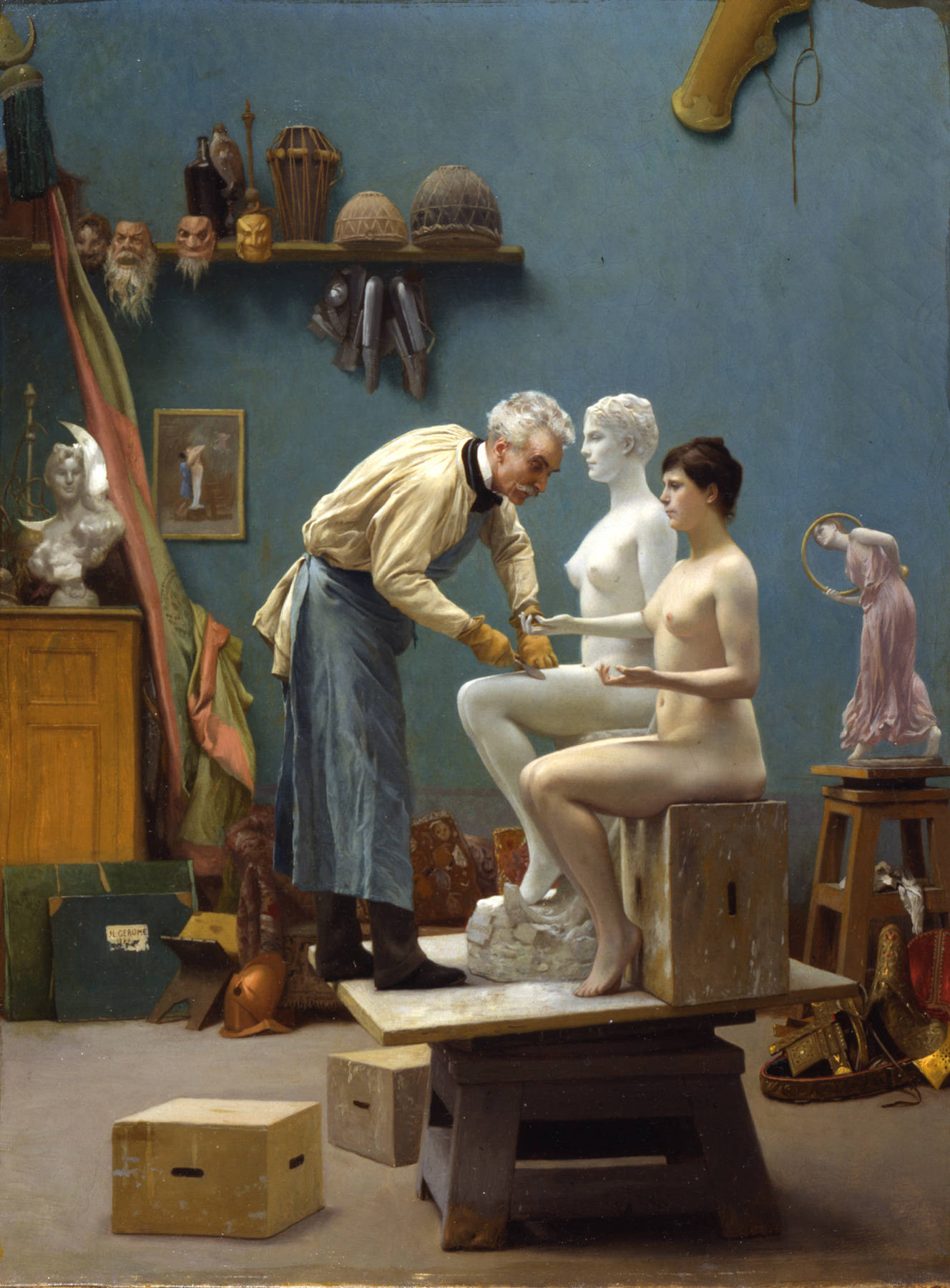
Working in Marble, 1890, Dahesh Museum of Art; Gérôme depicts himself sculpting Tanagra.

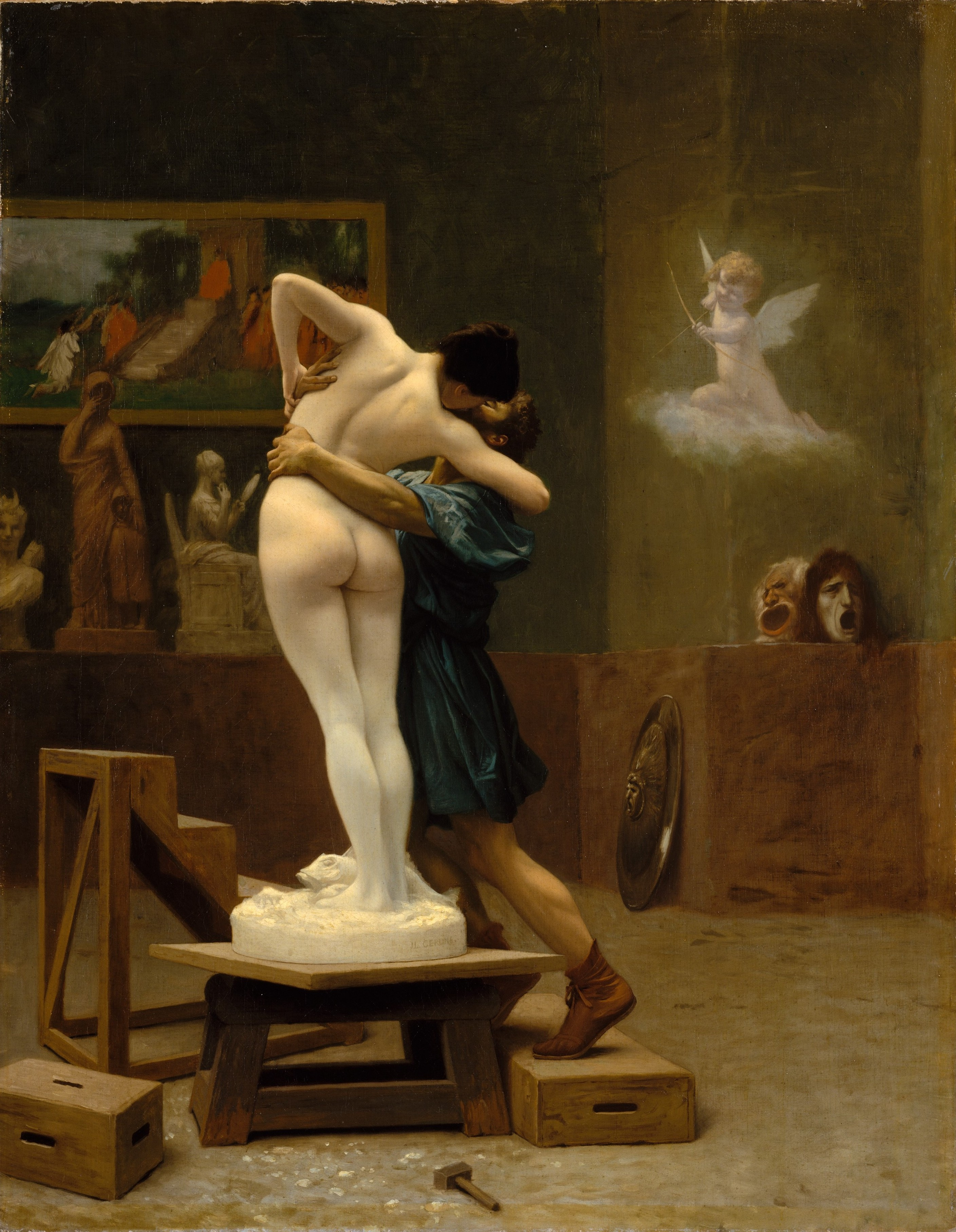
Pygmalion and Galatea, 1890, Metropolitan Museum of Art, seen in the background of The Artist and His Model.

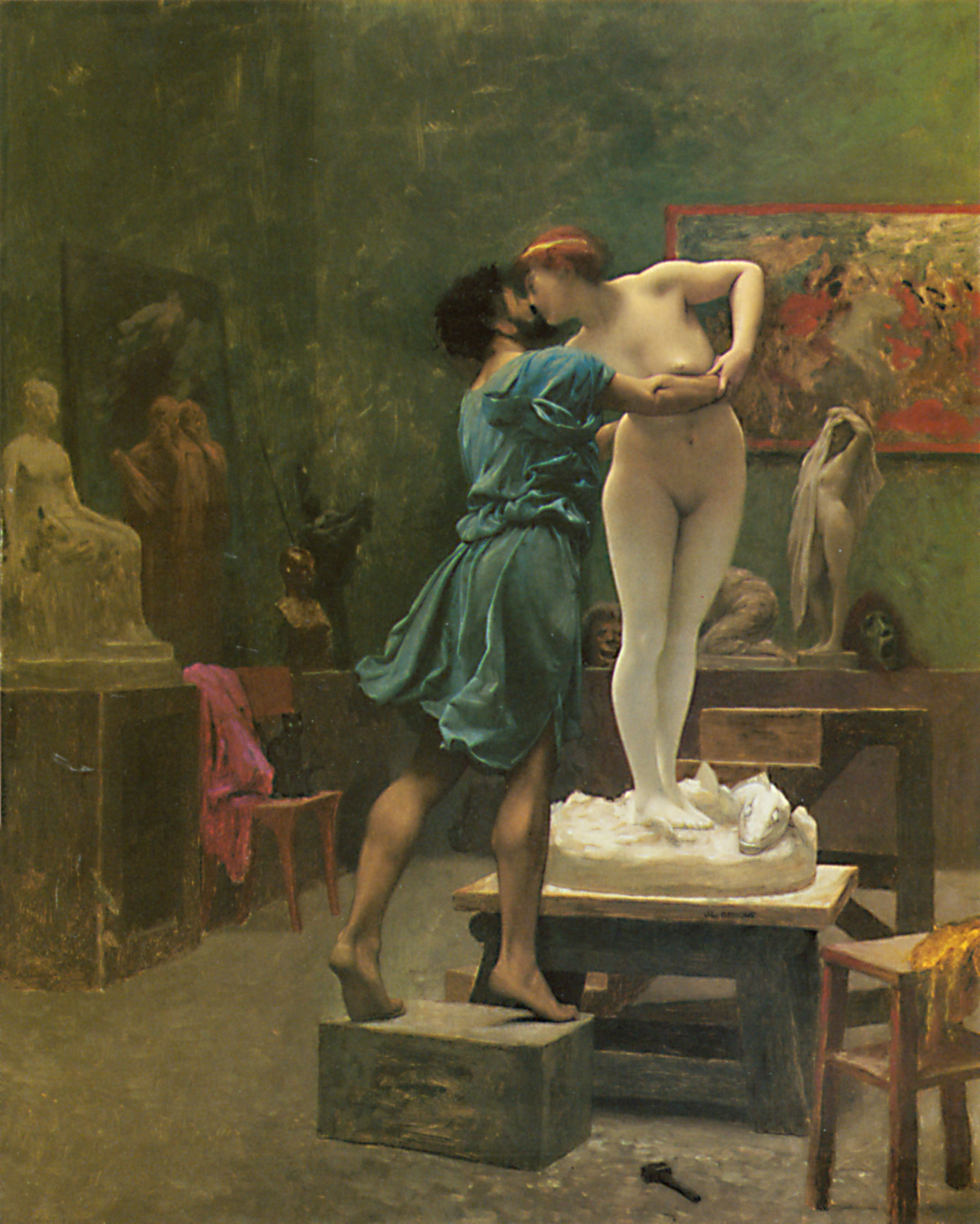
Pygmalion and Galatea, c. 1890, in a private collection, seen in the background of Working in Marble.

In 1894 and 1890, Gérôme painted two versions of a self-portrait depicting the artist at work in his atelier: The Artist and His Model-Emma Dupont (now at the Haggin Museum) and Working in Marble (Dahesh Museum of Art). The self-portraits are very similar, but differ in at least one significant respect.

In these self-portraits Gérôme is seen sculpting Tanagra from a live model, Emma Dupont, who holds the seated, stiffly upright pose, though her upturned palm is empty. Behind the model on its own stand is a large polychrome Hoop Dancer statuette of the sort Gérôme made for sale to the public. Various props litter the studio. In each painting, hanging on the wall in the background, is a painting by Gérôme of Pygmalion and Galatea, another of his works inspired by the ancient world (and made the same year as Tanagra). The self-portraits depict a real sculptor (Gérôme) bringing life to a statue by copying a living woman; the Pygmalion paintings depict a mythical sculptor whose statue is becoming a living woman.

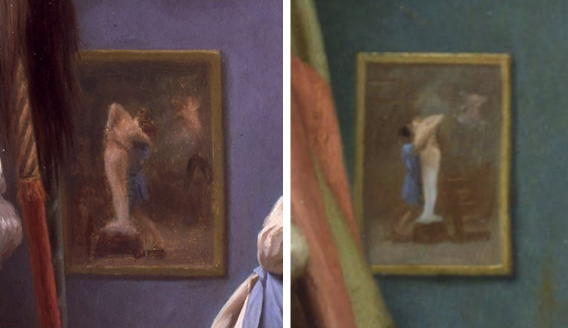
Left: Detail showing Pygmalion and Galatea in the background of The Artist and His Model. Right: detail showing a different Pygmalion and Galatea in the background of Working in Marble.

The doppelgängers and visual puns are complex, because the Pygmalion paintings in the two backgrounds are similar but not identical. Just as Gérôme painted two self-portraits, he also painted more than one version of Pygmalion and Galatea. The most famous, now in the Metropolitan Museum of Art, shows the kissing sculptor and statue from behind; it appears in the background of The Artist and His Model. But Gérôme painted at least one variant (now in a private collection), in which Pygmalion and Galatea are seen kissing from the front. This version appears in Working in Marble.

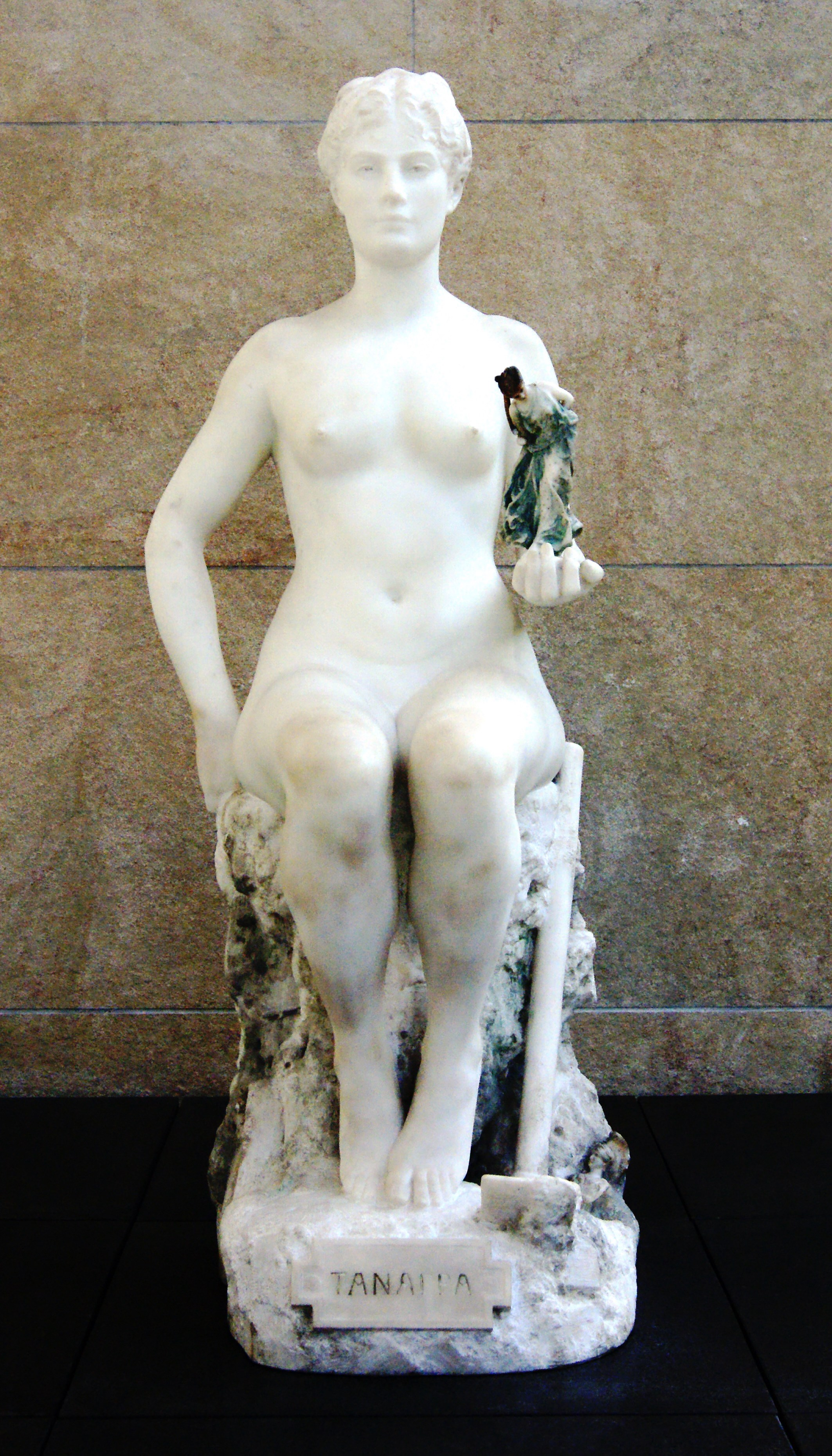
Tanagra at the Musée d'Orsay.

In both self-portraits, a variant of Pygmalion and Galatea is depicted as a painting of a mythical sculptor and living statue within a painting of a real sculptor, a living model, and (despite appearances) a plaster (not marble) statue.

Like most 19th-century sculptors, Gérôme did not carve the marble himself but furnished professional marble cutters with a full-size plaster to use as a guide. It is this intermediate step that is depicted in Working in Marble, a title that refers to the overall creative process. Gérôme portrays himself on a turn stand putting the finishing touches on the plaster version of Tanagra, carefully judging the accuracy of his work against the live model.

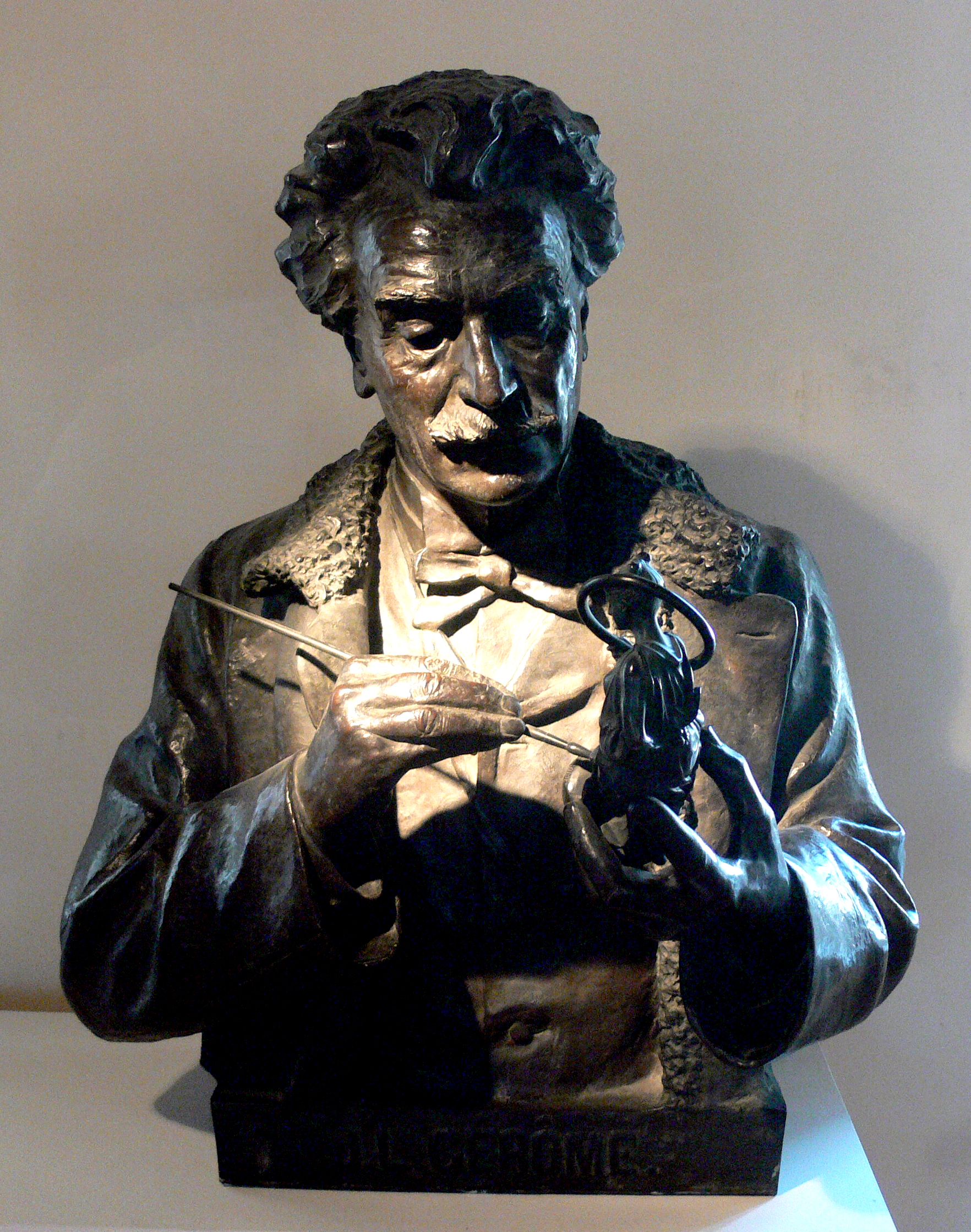
Léopold Bernhard Bernstamm, Gérome painting a hoop dancer, 1897, Musée Georges-Garret, Vesoul.

This complex self-portrait is "a summation of Gérôme's remarkable career as both painter and sculptor." As in all his works connected to Tanagra, we see Gérôme "powerfully evoking the continuous interplay between painting and sculpture, reality and artifice, as well as highlighting the inherently theatrical nature of the artist's studio."

The Haggin Museum also has a bronze Hoop Dancer by Gérôme, displayed beside The Artist and His Model.

The original Tanagra resides at the Musée d'Orsay (fiche oeuvre 15298). A 29.5-inch-high, gilded bronze version of Tanagra by Gérôme is held by the Phoenix Art Museum (object 1986.54), which also has a gilded bronze Hoop Dancer (object 2000.12). More gilded bronze versions of Tanagra exist; one was auctioned in 2011 by Sotheby's for 150,000 GBP, another in 2017 by for $50,000.

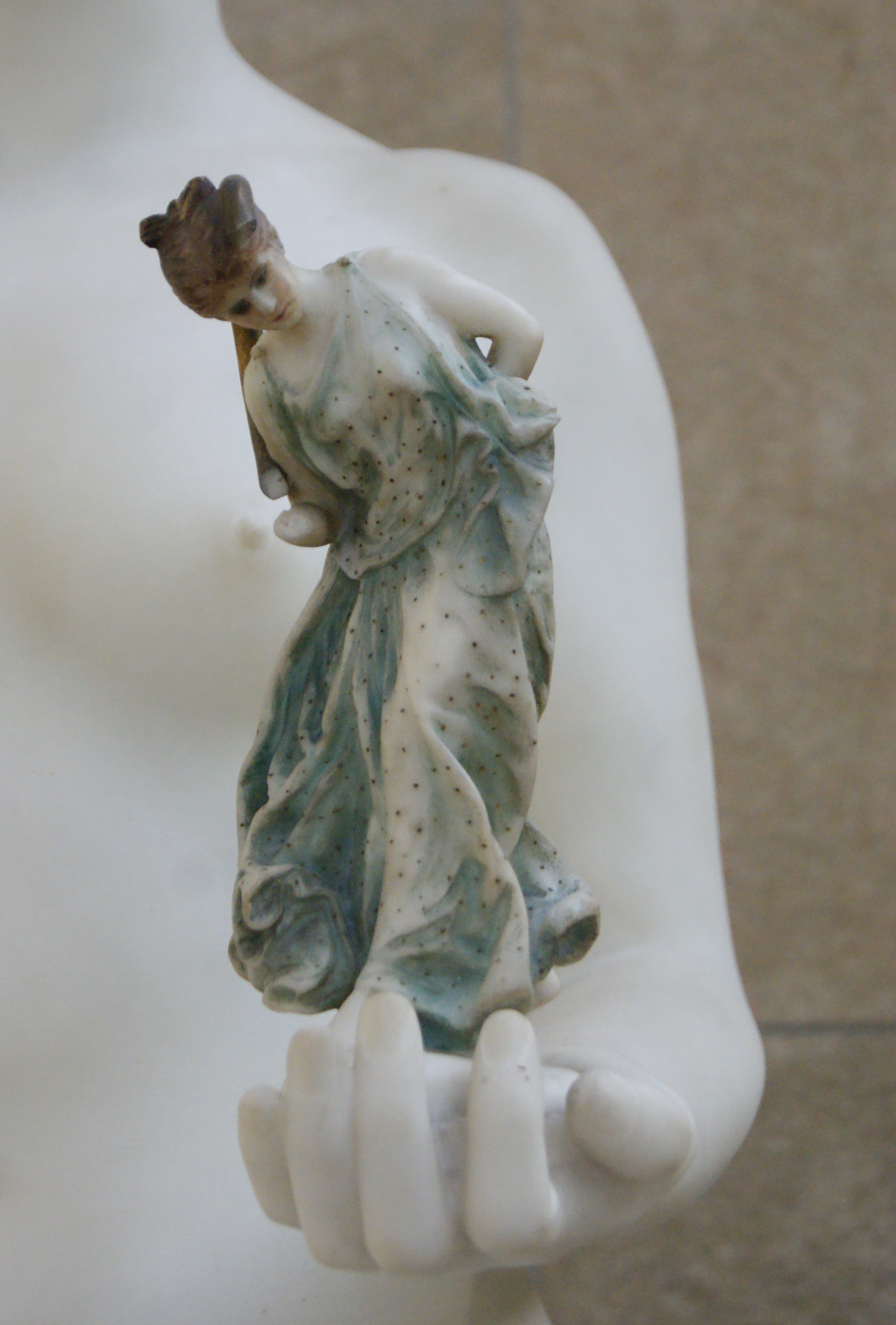
Close-up of the damaged, polychrome hoop dancer held by Tanagra, Musée d'Orsay.

== See also ==
- Pygmalion and Galatea (Gérôme painting)
- Tanagra figurines
