= Working in Marble =

Painting by Jean-Léon Gérôme

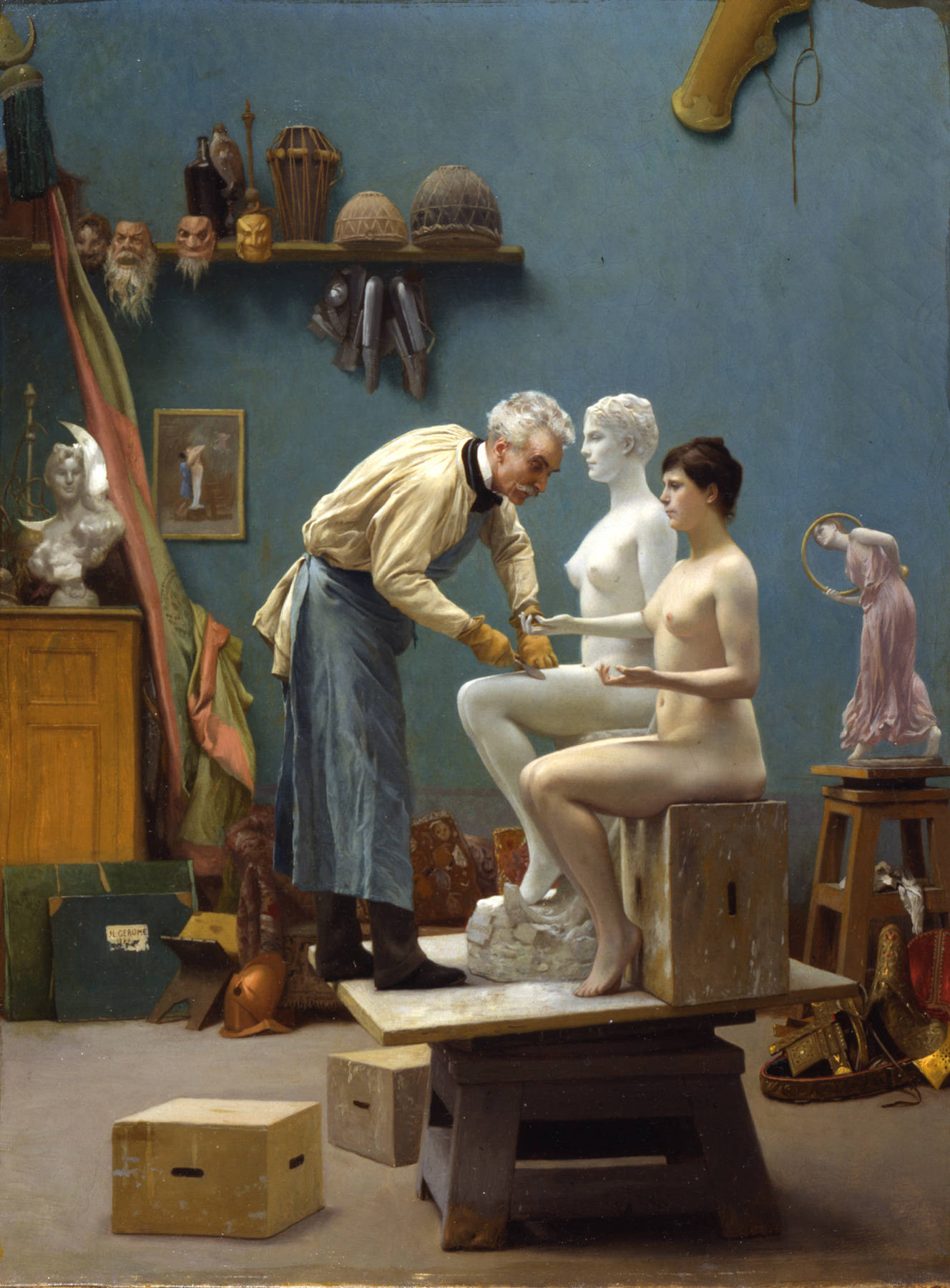
- Artist: Jean-Léon Gérôme
- Year: 1890
- Medium: Oil on canvas, nude art
- Dimensions: 50.4 cm × 39.3 cm (19.8 in × 15.5 in)
- Location: Dahesh Museum of Art; New York City

Working in Marble (French: Le travail du marbre) is an 1890 oil painting by the French artist Jean-Léon Gérôme. It depicts Gérôme working in his studio on the sculpture Tangara. The work makes reference to the Classical myth of Pygmalion who was brought to life by her creator. It features a self-portrait of Gérôme alongside the celebrated model Emma Dupont The work confirms to Gérôme's interest on Realism and is almost photographic in accuracy.

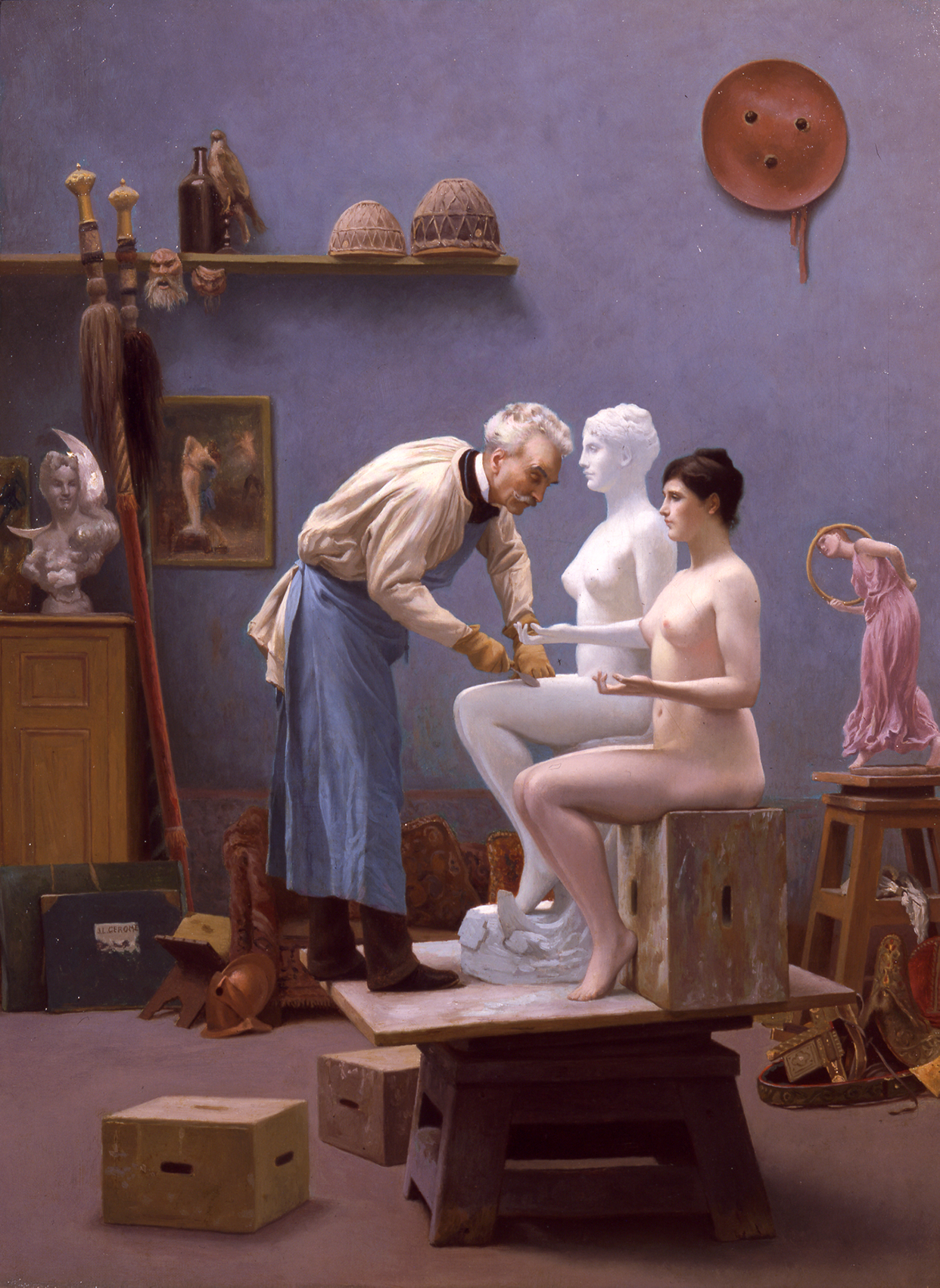
The Artist and His Model, 1895

The painting combines elements of nude art and portraiture and is produced in the Academic style for which Gérômea was best known. Today the painting is in the Dahesh Museum of Art in New York. Several other versions or variations of the painting exist, most notably The Artist and His Model (1895), now in the collection of the Haggin Museum in California.

== Bibliography ==
- Allan, Scott & Morton, Mary G. Reconsidering Gérôme. Getty Publications, 2010.
- Ackerman, Gerald M. The Life and Work of Jean-Léon Gérôme. Sotheby's Publications, 1986.
- Kern, Stephen. Eyes of Love: The Gaze in English and French Paintings and Novels, 1840-1900. Reaction Books, 1996.
