= Prayer in the Mosque =

Painting by Jean-Léon Gérôme

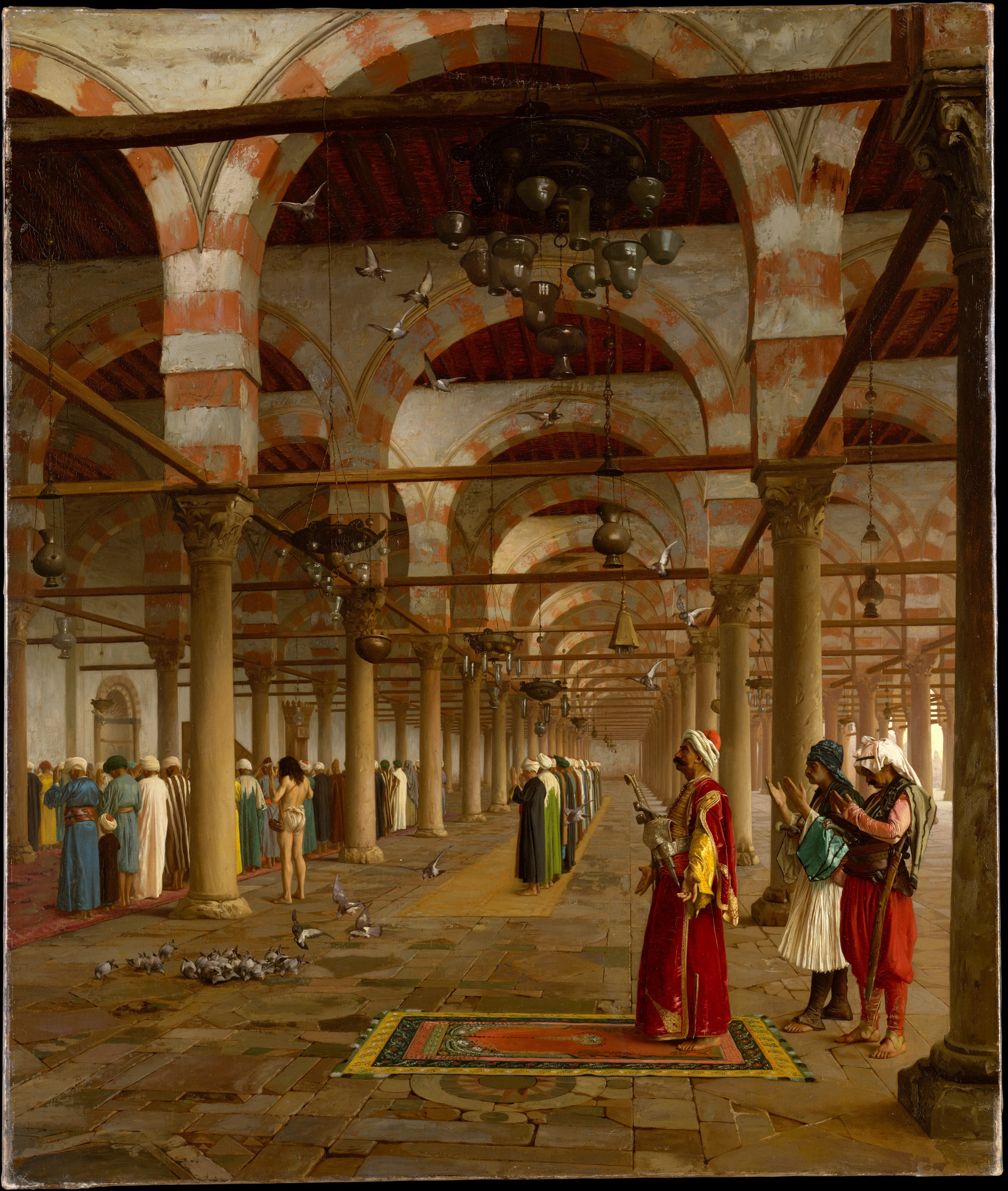
- Artist: Jean-Léon Gérôme
- Year: 1871
- Medium: Oil on canvas
- Dimensions: 88.9 cm × 74.9 cm (35.0 in × 29.5 in)
- Location: Metropolitan Museum of Art; New York
- Accession: 87.15.130

Prayer in the Mosque is an oil on canvas painting by French artist Jean-Léon Gérôme, from 1871. It depicts the interior of an Egyptian mosque where worshipers are seen praying. Some pigeons are also visible. The orientalist painting is in the collection of the Metropolitan Museum of Art, in New York.

The painting contains several errors that do not align with real Muslim practices. For instance, there are four simultaneous group prayers depicted, when in reality there would only be one. The dervish between rows two and three is also not clothed sufficiently to enter a mosque. In addition, the imam in red is not performing the takbir correctly.
