= Pandolfini =

Pandolfini is an Italian family name. It may refer to:

- Agnolo Pandolfini (1360-1446), Renaissance humanist
- Bruce Pandolfini (born 1947), American chess player and writer
- Egisto Pandolfini (1926–2019), Italian footballer
- Gianfranco Pandolfini (1920-1997), Italian water polo player, younger brother of Tullio Pandolfini
- Niccolò Pandolfini (1440-1518), Italian Roman Catholic bishop and cardinal
- Tullio Pandolfini (1914-1999), Italian water polo player
- Turi Pandolfini (1883-1962), Italian film actor

== Other uses ==
- Villa Pandolfini, Renaissance villa near Florence, Italy
