= Mongol elements in Western medieval art =

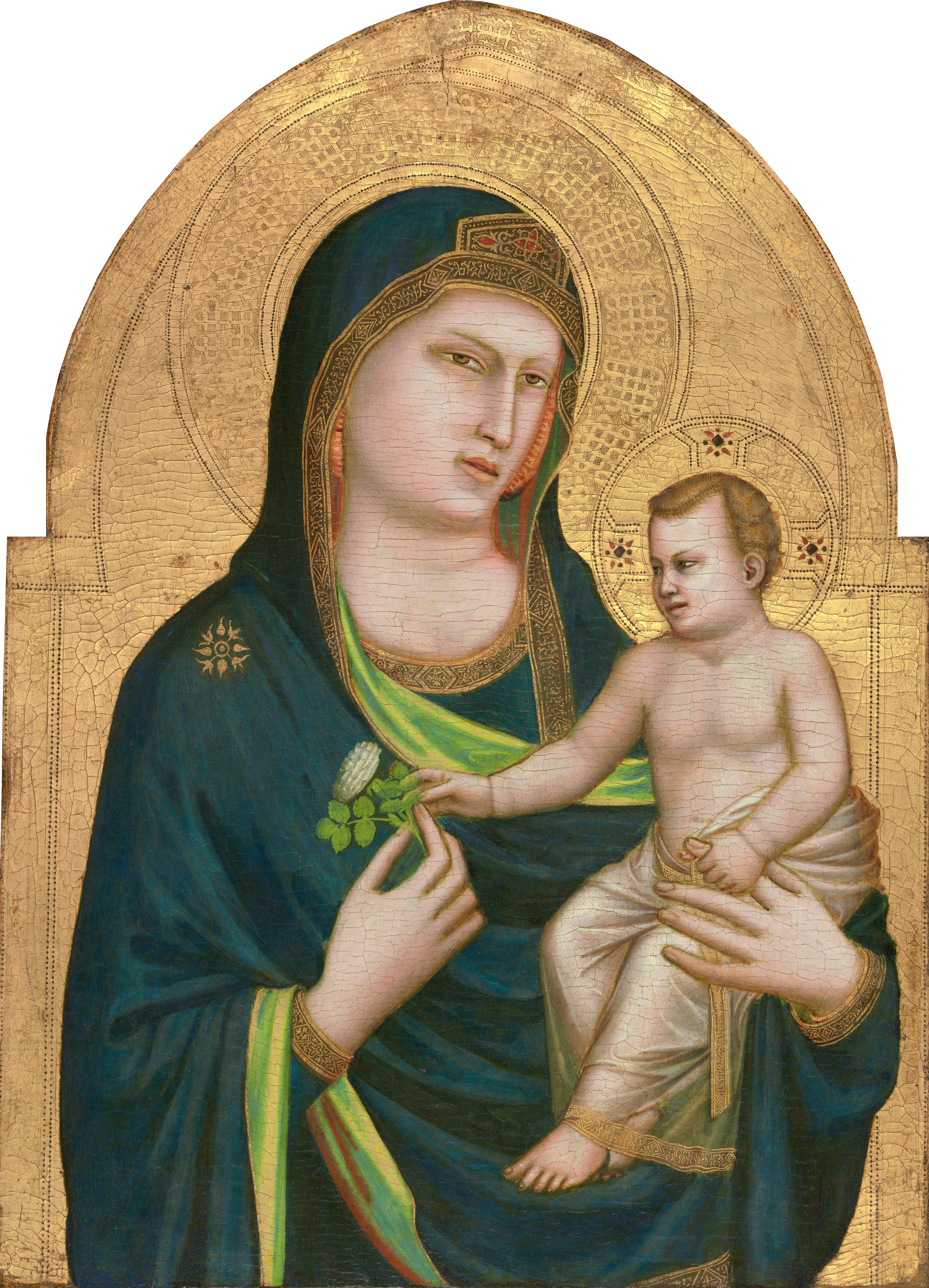
The hem band on Giotto's Madonna and Child (1320–1330) is a mix of Arabic and Mongol script characteristic of Giotto.

Mongol elements can be seen in European works of art ranging from the 13th to the 15th century. They encompass artistic areas such as painting and textile manufacture, and mainly consist in the European use of Mongol 'Phags-pa script in Medieval European art, as well as the representation of "Tartar" cloth and Mongol soldiers in a number of contemporary European paintings.

== Mongol script in medieval art ==
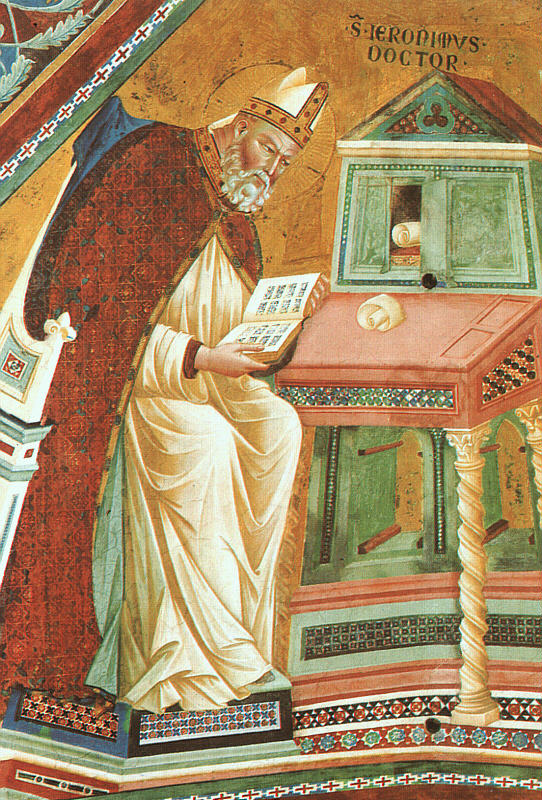
Saint Jerome reading a pseudo-Mongol script, consisting of an imitation of blocks of 'Phags-pa letters, written horizontally rather than vertically. 1296–1300, Church of San Francesco Assisi.

During the period of interaction between the Mongols and the West, from the late 13th century to early 14th century, some Italian painters incorporated Mongol script (particularly the 'Phags-pa script) into their religious painting. Examples can be seen especially in the frescos of the Upper Church of San Francesco at Assisi, or in the paintings of Giotto and related painters.

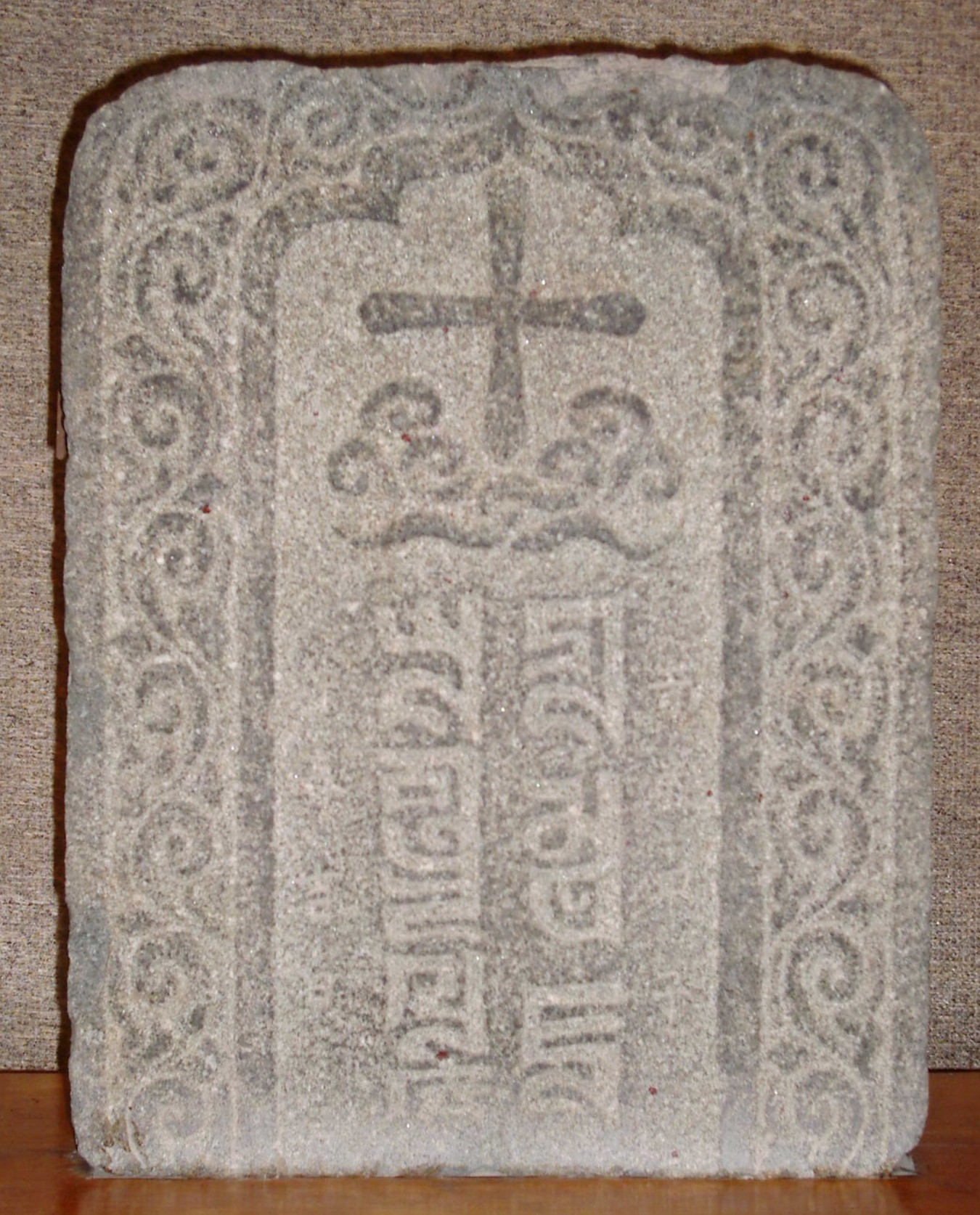
Christian tombstone from Quanzhou with Mongol 'Phags-pa inscriptions, 1324.

These inscriptions often imitated the Mongol 'Phags-pa, probably discovered by the artists through Mongol paper money or paiza (travel passes) such as those Marco Polo was issued with during his travels. Frescos of Saint Jerome, Augustine and Pope Gregory I in the Church of San Francesco in Assisi (1296–1300) are known where they study books written in pseudo-Mongol. The famous Renaissance painter Giotto and his pupils often combined Arabic and 'Phags-pa script in their paintings. In Giotto's The Crucifixion (1304-1312/1313), soldiers wear tunics inscribed with pseudo-Mongol bands. In Giotto's Madonna and Child (1320–1330), the Virgin Mary's robe is decorated with a hem in a mix of Arabic and Mongol script. Giotto again used the Mongolian script in the Scrovegni Chapel.

Besides the influence of exchanges between the Western and Mongol realms during the period, the exact reason for the incorporation of Mongol script in early Renaissance painting is unclear. It seems that Westerners believed 13–14th century Middle-Eastern scripts (such as Mongol and Arabic) to be the same as the scripts current during Jesus's time, and thus found it natural to represent early Christians in association with them. This may have been partly because some objects from the Islamic era with inscriptions were treated as relics. Another reason might be that artist wished to express a cultural universality for the Christian faith, by blending together various written languages, at a time when the church had strong international ambitions. Possibly, the usage of Mongol cultural markers was also a way to express the eastern links of European religious orders such as the Franciscans.

In the East, a certain degree of cultural and artistic interaction is known due to the development of Christianity among the Mongols. The use of the Mongol script in association with representations of Christianity can be seen for example in Nestorian Christian steles, such as those found in Quanzhou which are dated to the 14th century.

The use of Phags-pa Mongol script in Medieval European painting had remained unnoticed however, until it was first identified in the 1980s by the Japanese scholar Hidemichi Tanaka. His findings were published in his 1983 paper The Mongolian Script in Giotto Paintings at the Scrovegni Chapel at Padova. Kufic Arabic script is even more often used in a similar way, known as Pseudo-Kufic.

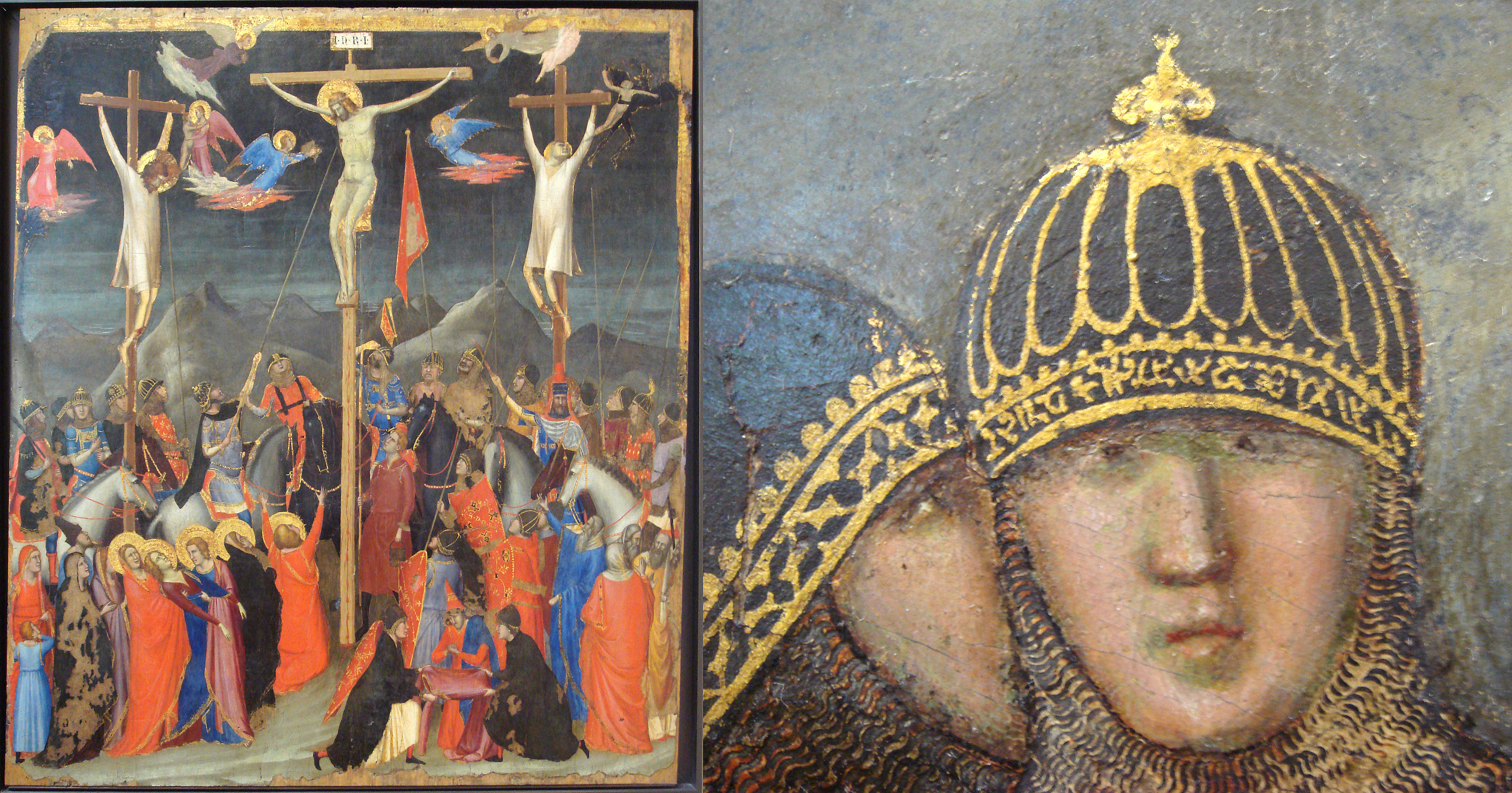
Giotto's Crucifixion with soldier wearing headband in pseudo-Mongol script, circa 1330.

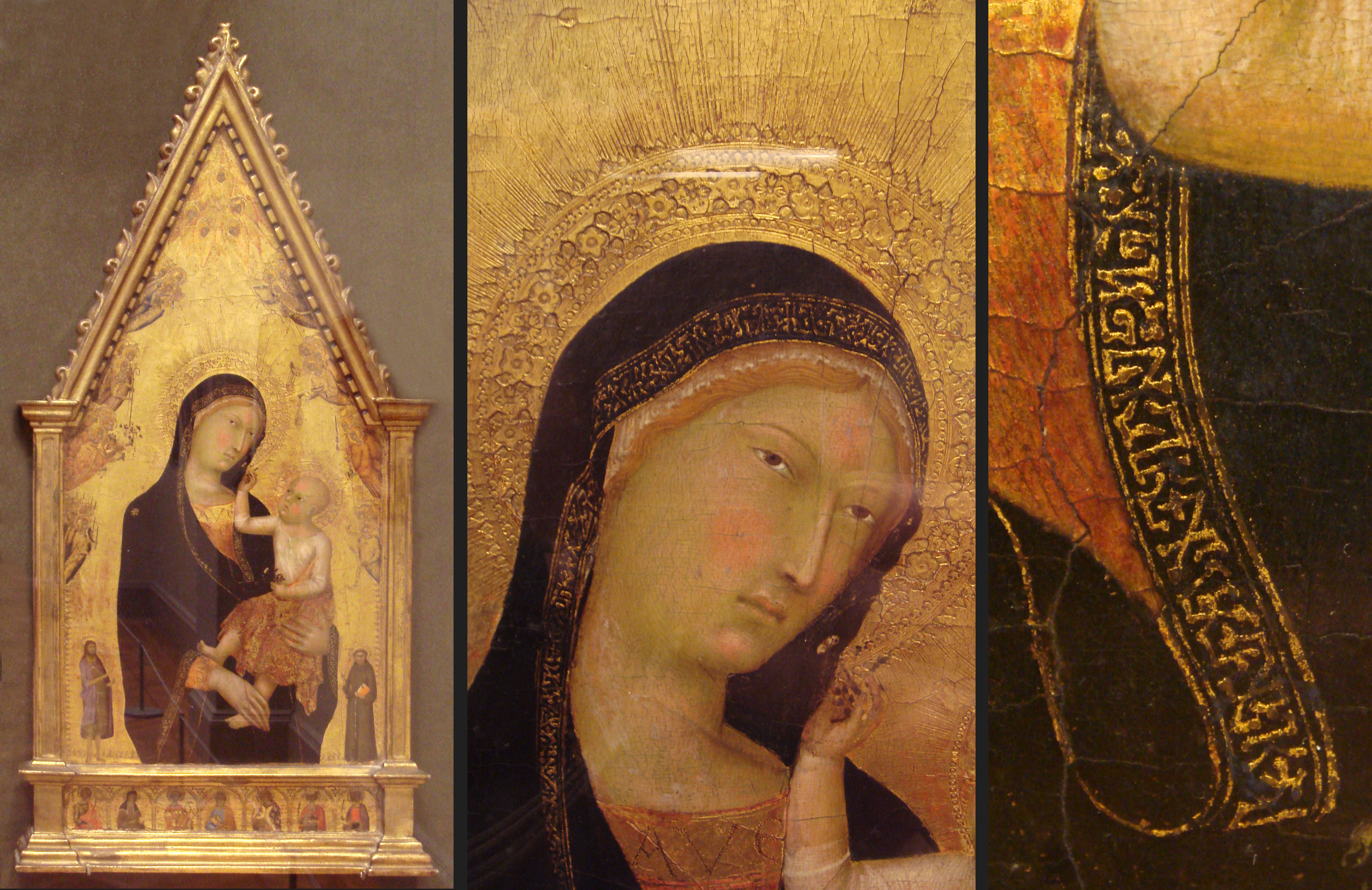
Madonna and Child with Saints and Angels, Filippo di Memmo, Siena, circa 1350.

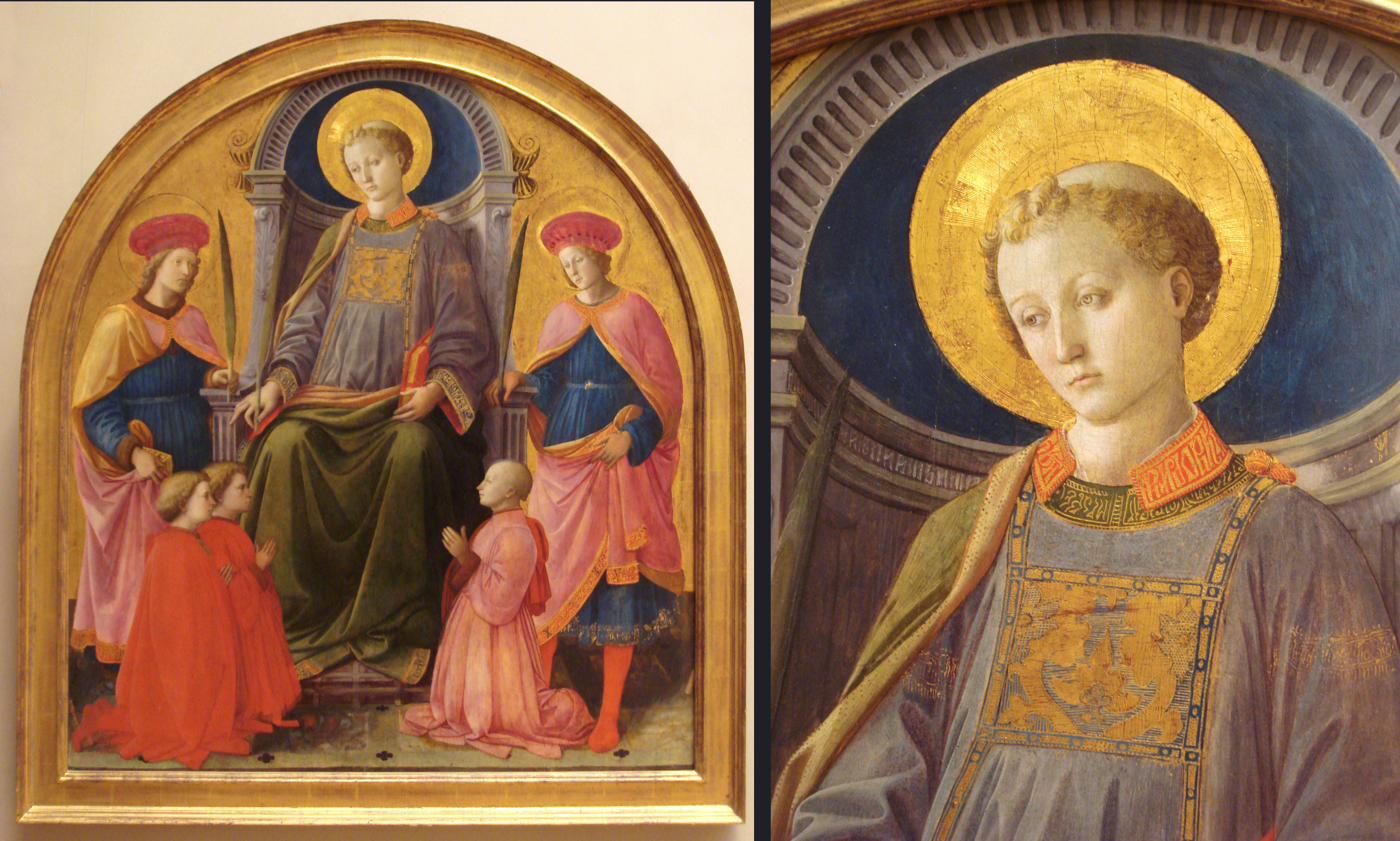
Saint Lawrence, by Fra Filippo Lippi, circa 1440.

== Mongol Empire "Tatar" textiles in medieval art ==
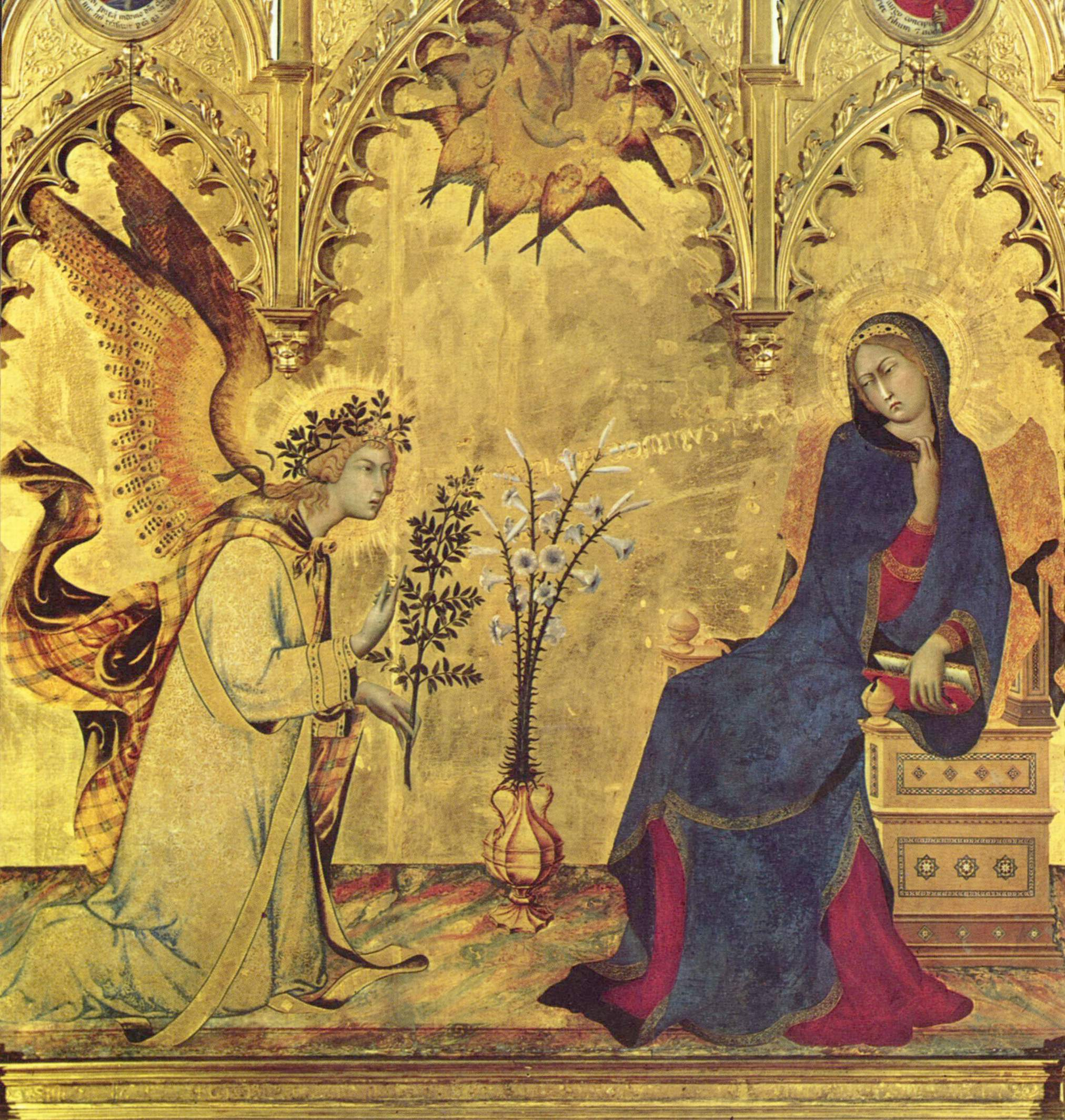
Fig. 23: Small-patterned Tartar-style textiles are worn by Angel Gabriel in the Annunciation by Simone Martini (1333).

Around 1300, an influx of Mongol Empire textiles found their way to Italy, and were to prove quite influential in Italian art. These textiles even revolutionized Italian textile designs. Between 1265 and 1308, communications between Western and Il-Khanid rulers led to numerous exchanges of people and presents, as when about 100 Mongols in Mongol dress visited Rome for the Papal Jubilee of Pope Boniface VIII in 1300. Large quantities of panni tartarici (Tatar cloth) were recorded in the Papal inventory of 1295, and must have been diplomatic gifts from the Il-Khanate. Later on, Western merchants were also able to purchase such textiles from Tabriz, and the Mongol capital of Sultaniya, established by Öljaitü between 1305 and 1313, and until the capture of the Cilician Armenia harbour of Ayas by the Mamluks in 1347. The Tatar cloths were a produce of transcultural exchange under Mongol rule. They are described as Mongol nasij cloth, coming from Mongol, by author Lauren Arnold.

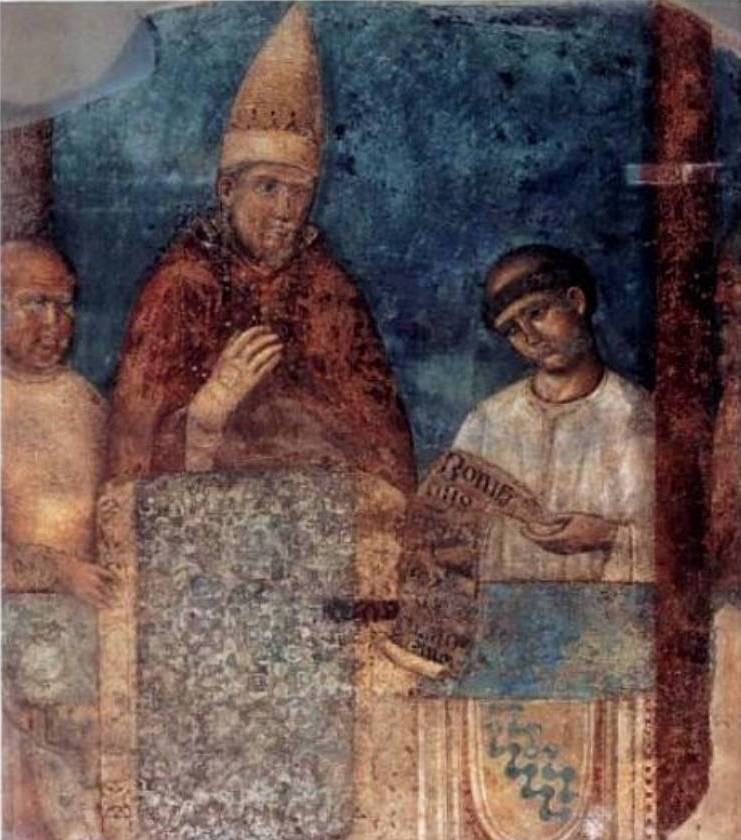
Pope Boniface VIII at the 1300 jubilee with a "Tartar cloth" in front of him, with a "rhythmic Sino-Mongolian pattern".

Mongol Empire textiles had a strong impact on Italian textile design from around 1330. A type of Tartar cloth that was adopted in the West consisted in small-pattern designs in dense composition. This sort of textile is represented in the clothing of the angel Gabriel in the Annunciation by Simone Martini (1333).

Other designs involved naturally flowing compositions of flowers and vines with fantastic animals. Such a textile is depicted as the background curtain in Giotto's Coronation of the Virgin (circa 1330), the earliest such depiction of a Tartar cloth. Chinese types of floral designs were also adopted, as visible in the mantles of Christ and Mary in Coronation of the Virgin by Paolo Veneziano (circa 1350).

Transmission of Chinese textile designs from the Mongol Yuan Dynasty also occurred: Textiles of Iran and Iraq in the 14th century incorporated Chinese phoenix designs in silk and gold thread, and Italian weavers adopted such designs from the second half of the 14th century, complete with phoenix designs and silk and gold thread. These designs are of Chinese origin, and reached Europe via the Mongol realm.

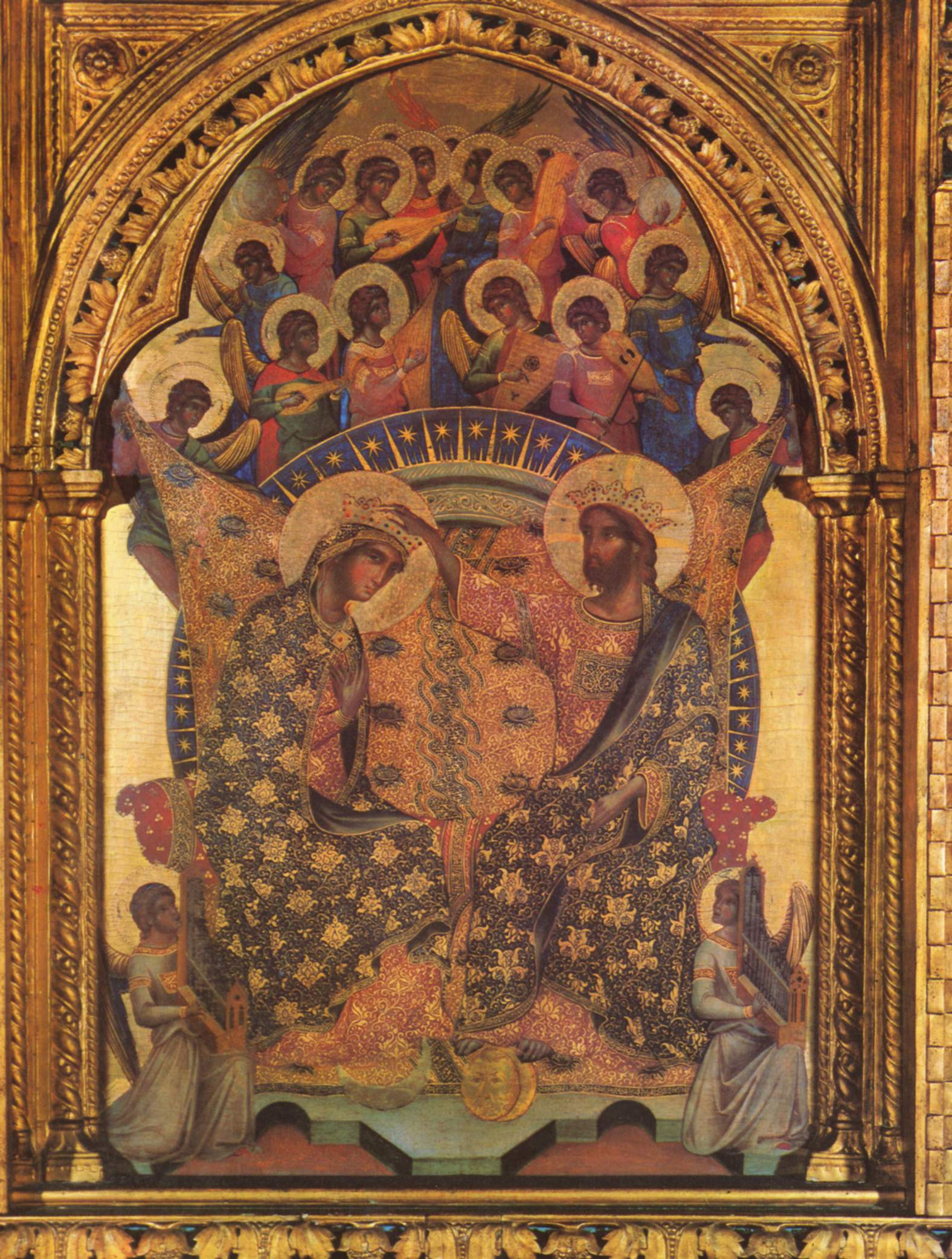
Fig. 28: Chinese-style floral designs are visible in the mantles of Christ and Mary in Coronation of the Virgin by Paolo Veneziano (circa 1350).

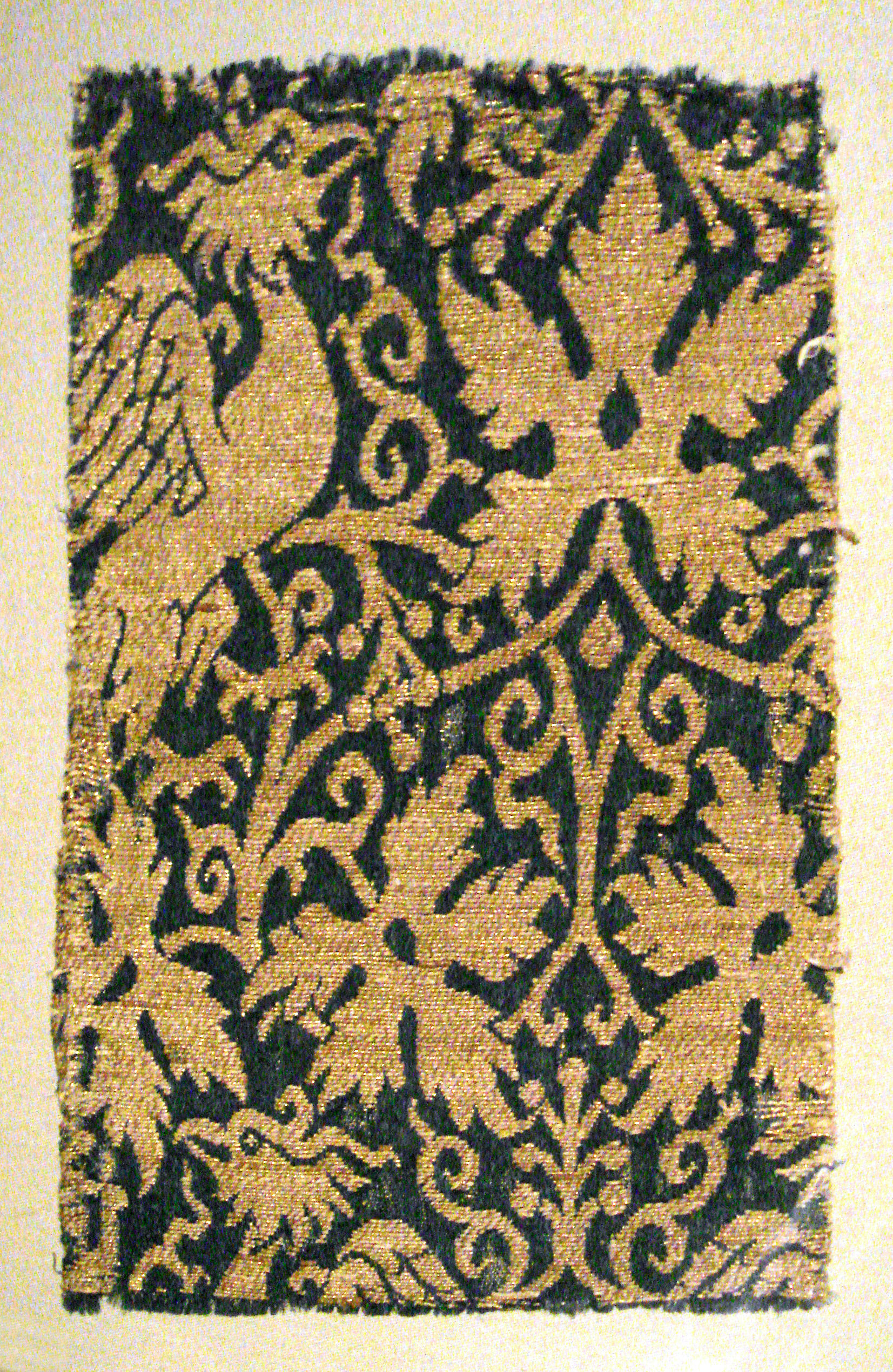
Lampas with phoenix, silk and gold, Iran or Iraq, 14th century.

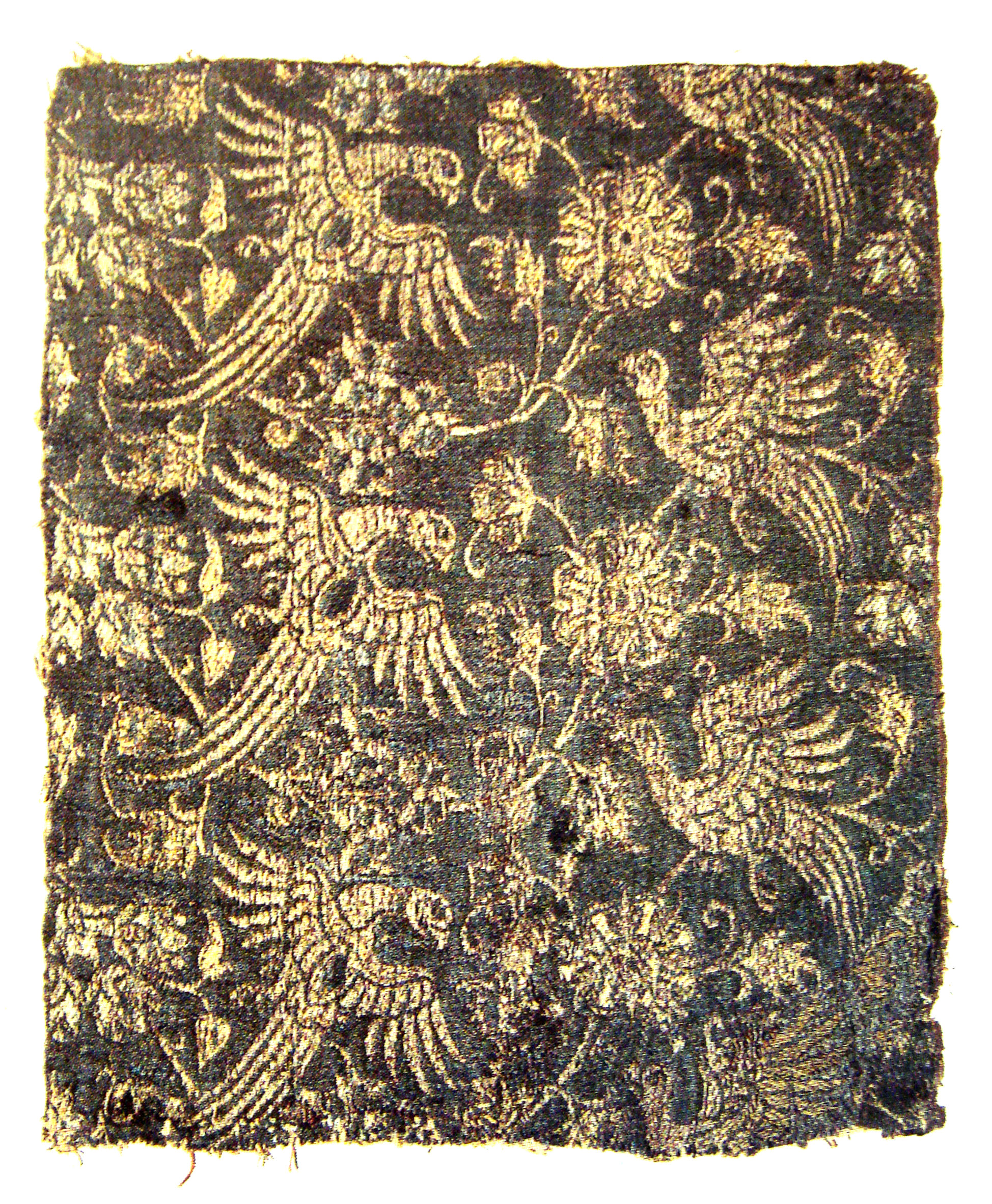
Lampas textile, silk and gold, Italy, second half of 14th century.

== Mongols in European painting ==
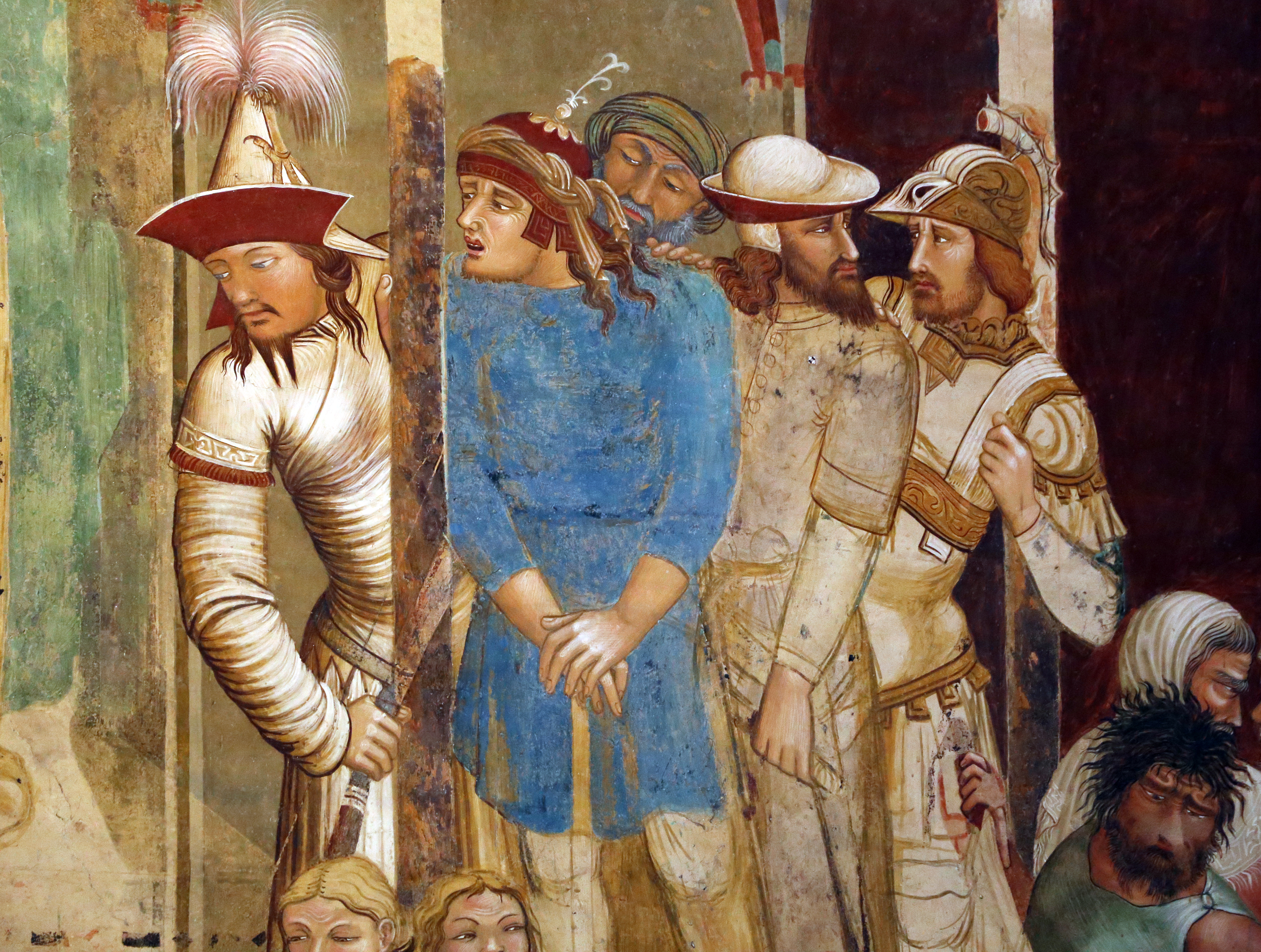
Mongol commander of a thousand troops (at left), in Ambrogio Lorenzetti's Martyrdom of the Franciscans, 1330.

Mongols are visible in a variety of European paintings from the 13–14th century. They suggest that Italian artists had been in direct contact with people from Tartary. The Mongols seen in the European paintings from the late 13th century and throughout 14th century are from a diverse ethnic population of the Golden Horde composed of Tatars, Mongols who adopted Islam later, as well as Finns, Sarmato-Scythians, Slavs, and people from the Caucasus, among others (whether Muslim or not). The horde's population of soldiers and commanders are from a diverse ethnic Mongols, Turkic Tatars, Europeans, with Mongols being the ruling core.

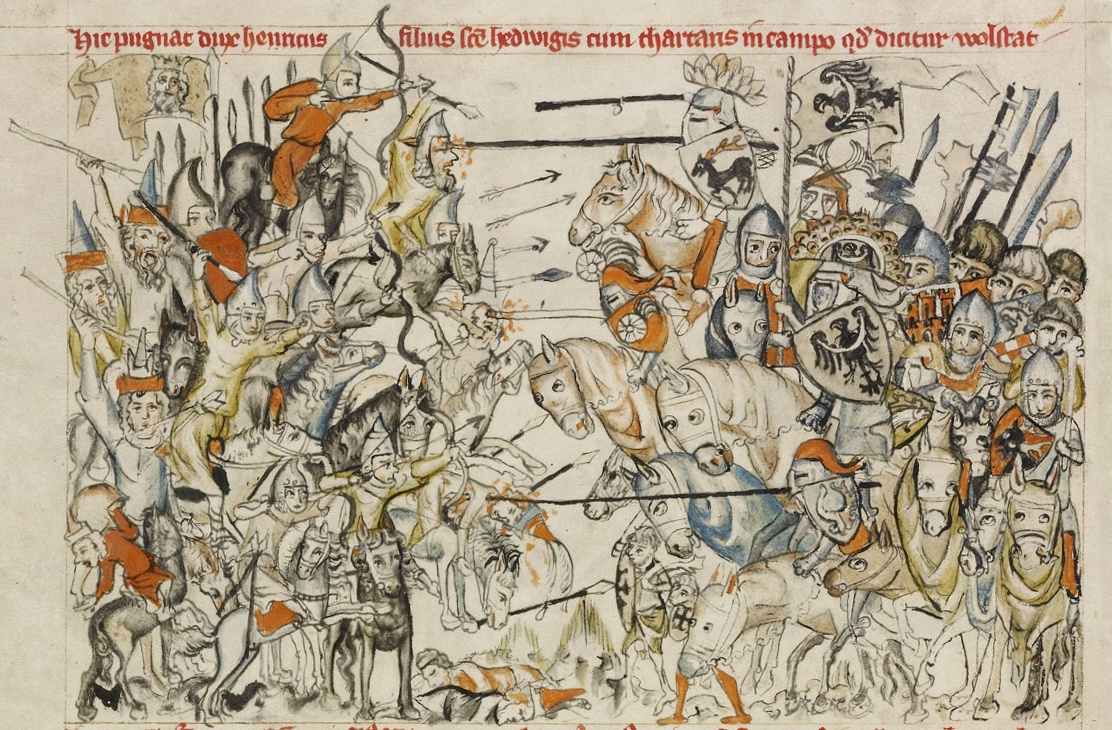
The battle of Liegnitz, 1241, between the Mongols (left) and European knights (right). 14th century drawing.

Kubilai Khan giving financial support to the Polo family

As early as 1253, during the initial encounters of the Mongols with the West following the Mongol invasion of Europe, Matthew Paris represented Mongol soldiers with their characteristic conical hat as cannibals in his Chronica Majora.

Later, the Mongols would appear in much less caricatural portrayals. The travels of Marco Polo to the Mongol Empire gave rise to opulent descriptions of the Mongol ruler Kublai Khan and his court.

Mongols were then occasionally incorporated in the work of European painters, particularly illustrations of events in Asia or the Holy Land. Among other works, Mongol horsemen appear in the Crucifixion of Saint Peter, Giotto, circa 1299, probably following the visit of Mongol visitors from the East, such as the Mongol delegation who is known to have participated to the 1300 Papal Jubilee in Rome.

Mongol archers are also shown shooting at Sebastian in Martyrdom of Saint Sebastian, Giovanni del Biondo, circa 1370, and Mongol commanders in uniform appear in Ambrogio Lorenzetti's Martyrdom of the Franciscans (1285–1348) with their characteristic conical hat decorated with a feather.

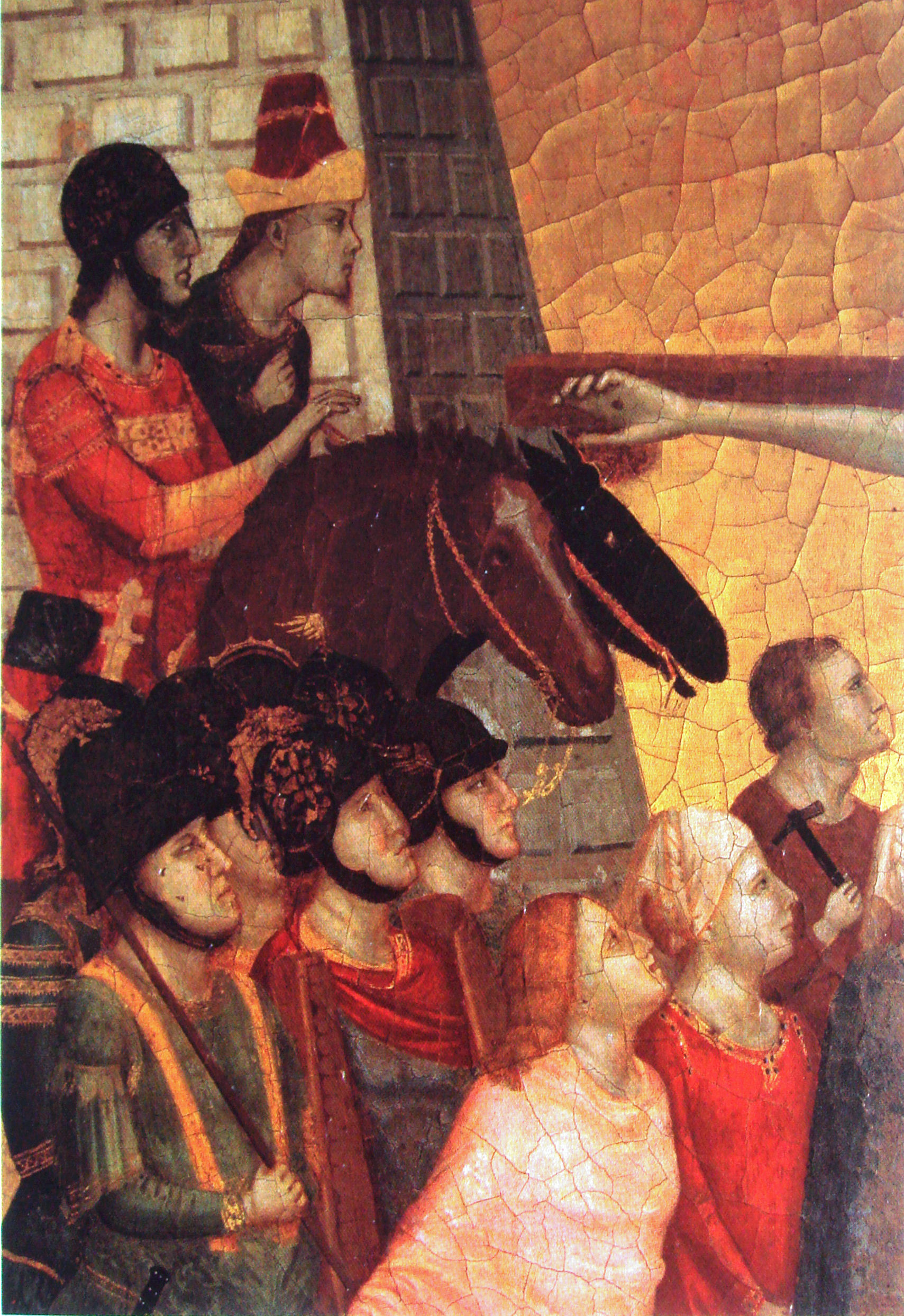
Mongol horseman in the Crucifixion of Saint Peter, Giotto, circa 1299.

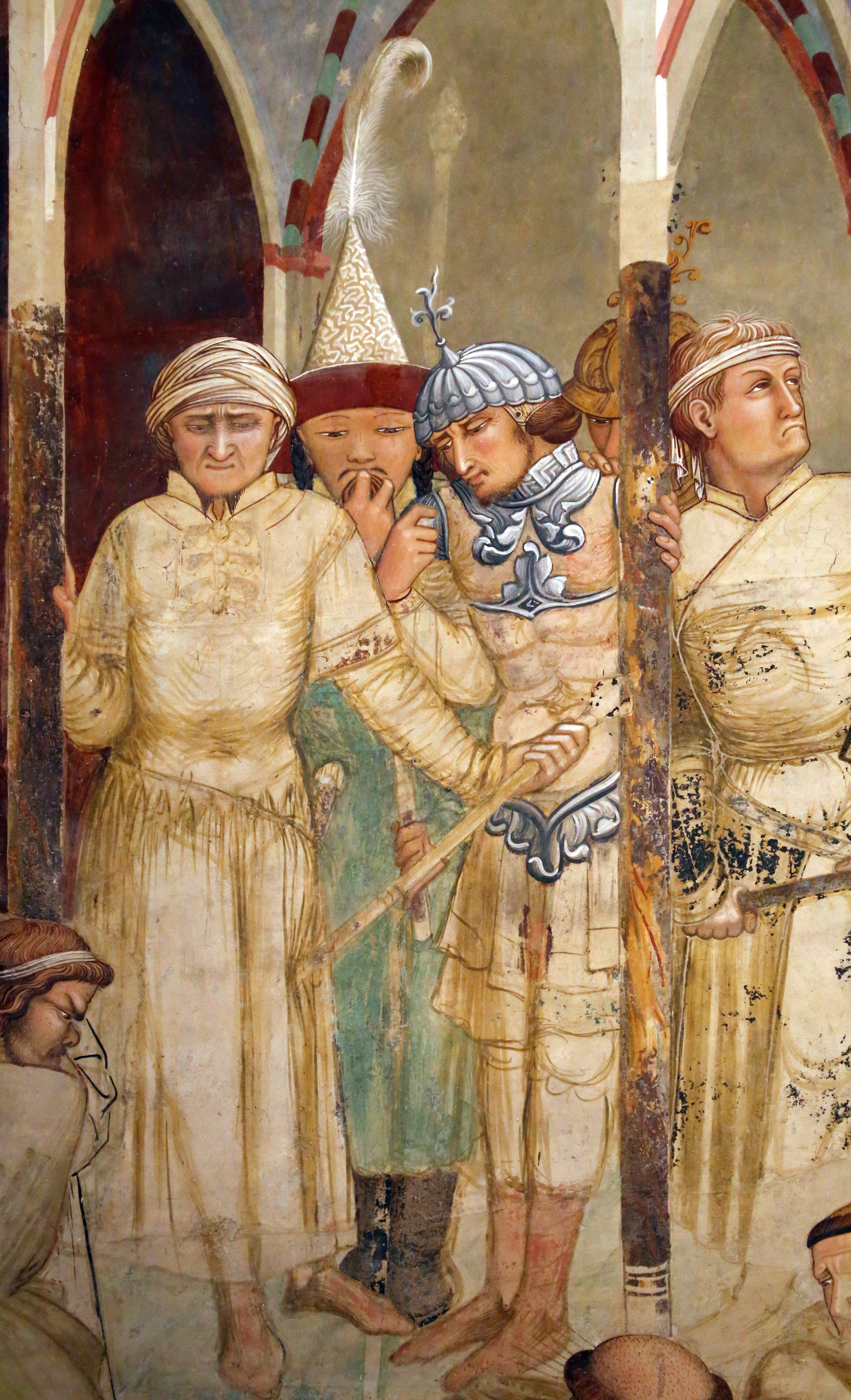
Ambrogio Lorenzetti's Martyrdom of the Franciscans (1285–1348) depicting the garb of a Mongol commander of a thousand (conical hat with the feather).

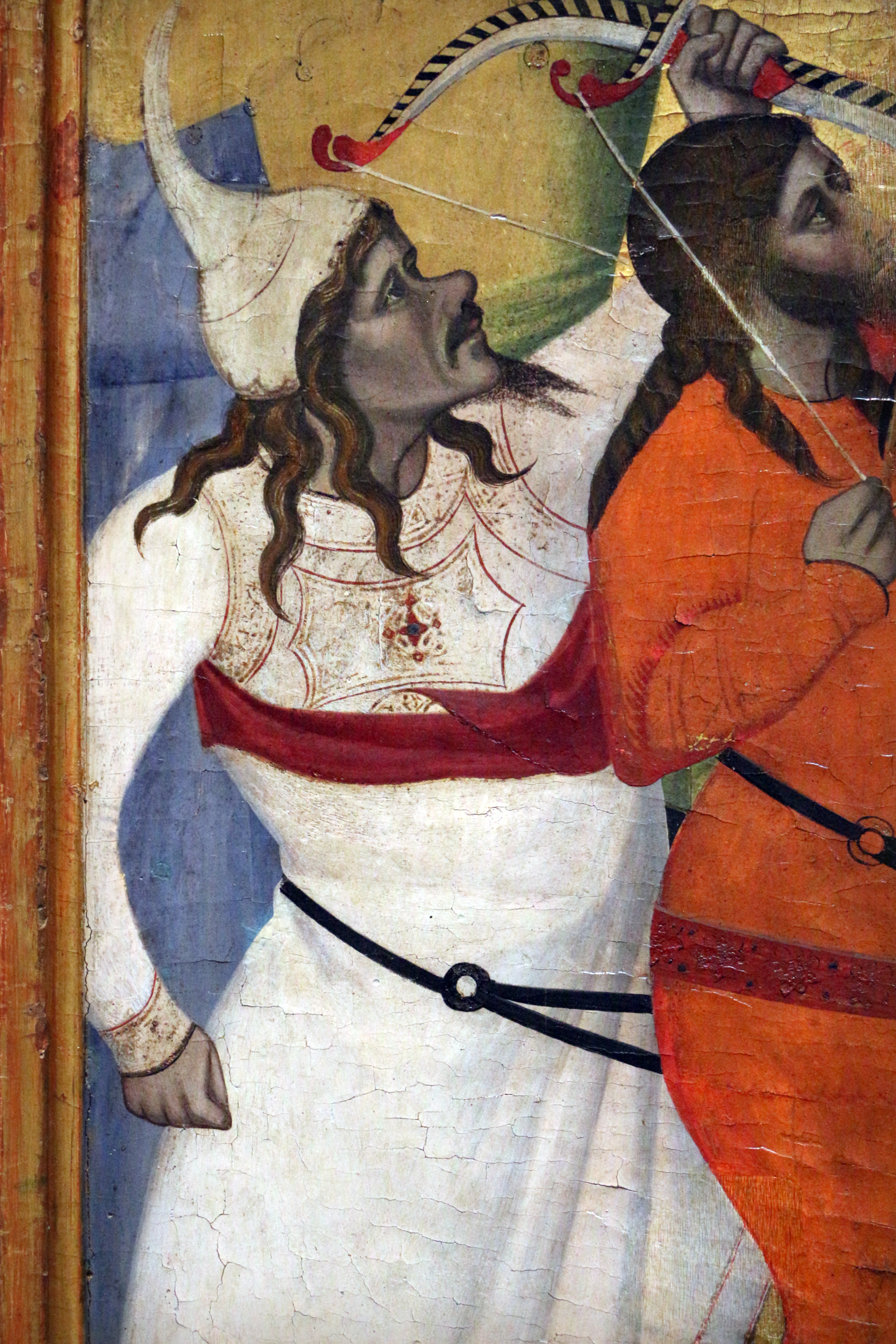
Mongol archer shooting at Sebastian in Martyrdom of Saint Sebastian, Giovanni del Biondo, circa 1370.

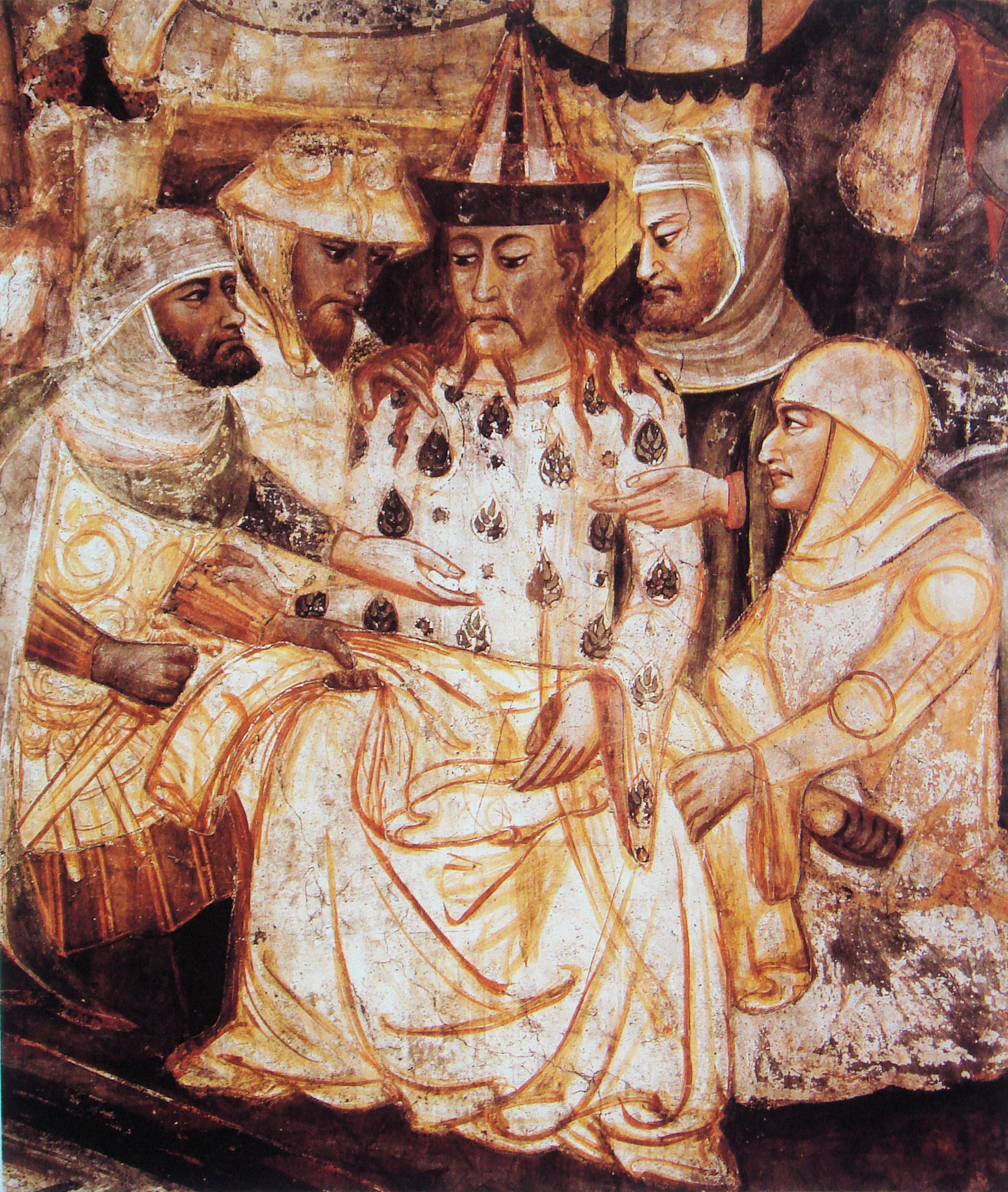
Bargaining for the Cloth of Christ in Crucifixion, Master of the Trecento, circa 1350.

== Sources ==
- Mack, Rosamond E. Bazaar to Piazza: Islamic Trade and Italian Art, 1300–1600, University of California Press, 2001 ISBN 0-520-22131-1
- Arnold, Lauren Princely Gifts and Papal Treasures, University of San Francisco, 1999 ISBN 0-9670628-0-2
