= Matteo di Cione =

Italian sculptor

Matteo di Cione (1330–1380) was an Italian sculptor, notable for being the brother of three of the great painters of Gothic Florence, Nardo di Cione, Jacopo di Cione and Andrea di Cione. The di Cione (pronounced dee choh’ nay) brothers often worked collaboratively, and Matteo is known to have supplied marble for Orcagna's altarpiece in the Orsanmichele (c.1381).
