= 1380 in Italy =

List of years in Italy
- … 1370; 1371; 1372; 1373; 1374; 1375; 1376; 1377; 1378; 1379; 1380; 1381; 1382; 1383; 1384; 1385; 1386; 1387; 1388; 1389; 1390 …
- Art; Archaeology; Architecture; Literature; Music; Philosophy; Science; +...

A series of events which occurred in Italy in 1380:

- Battle of Chioggia

The naval Battle of Chioggia took place in June 1380 in the lagoon off Chioggia, Italy, between the Venetian and the Genoese fleets, who had captured the little fishing port in August the preceding year. This occurred during the War of Chioggia.

== Births ==
Giovanni Berardi

== Deaths ==
Matteo di Cione
