= Matteo Palmieri =

Florentine humanist and historian

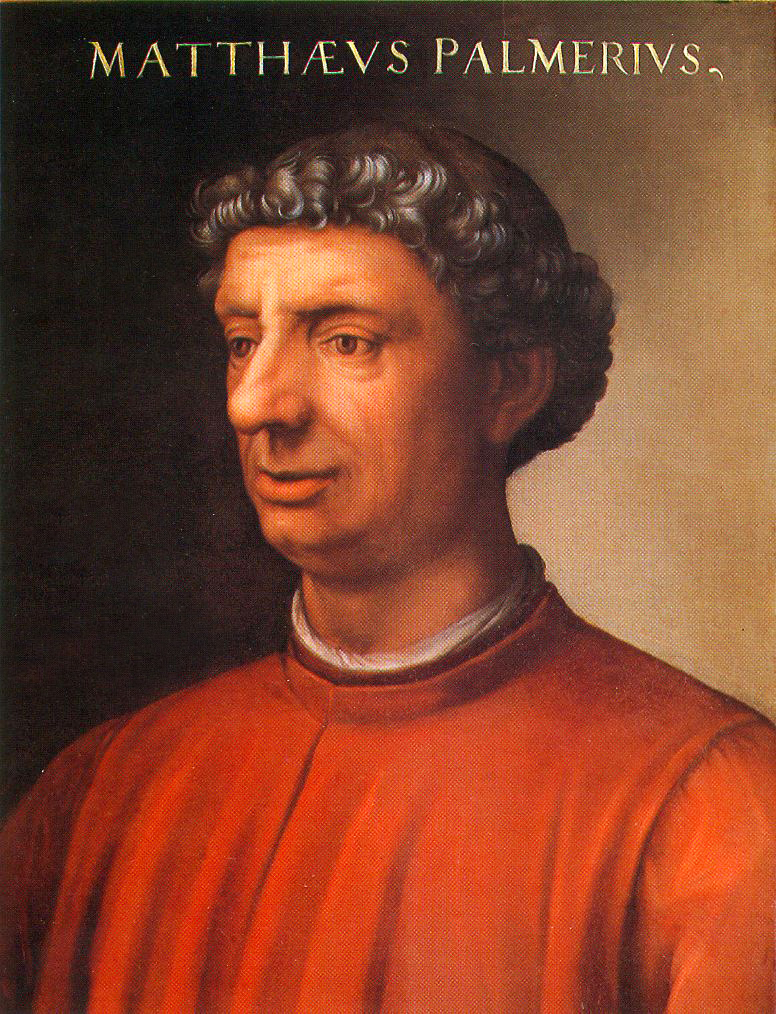
Portrait of Matteo Palmieri, by Cristofano dell'Altissimo

Matteo di Marco Palmieri (1406–1475) was a Florentine humanist and historian who is best known for his work Della vita civile ("On Civic Life"; printed 1528) which advocated civic humanism, and his influence in refining the Tuscan vernacular to the same level as Latin. He was sent as Florentine ambassador to the court of Alfonso I of Naples. Vespasiano da Bisticci included him among the illustrious men of his generation whose careers deserved an article in his Vite di uomini illustri del secolo XV vita.

== Biography ==
Palmieri was born to a middle-class family who held prominent positions in the city. He was educated in Florence and ran a profitable apothecary shop. Like his father Matteo Palmieri, he pursued a career in civil service, becoming a well-known and respected public official between 1432 and 1475, holding many posts and titles.

At the end of his life, he commissioned from the Florentine painter Francesco Botticini (1446–1498) a monumental Assumption of the Virgin for the church of the Benedictine nunnery of San Pier Maggiore in Florence, where the Palmieri had their chapel; in the painting are the kneeling donor portraits of Matteo and his wife Niccolosa de' Serragli.

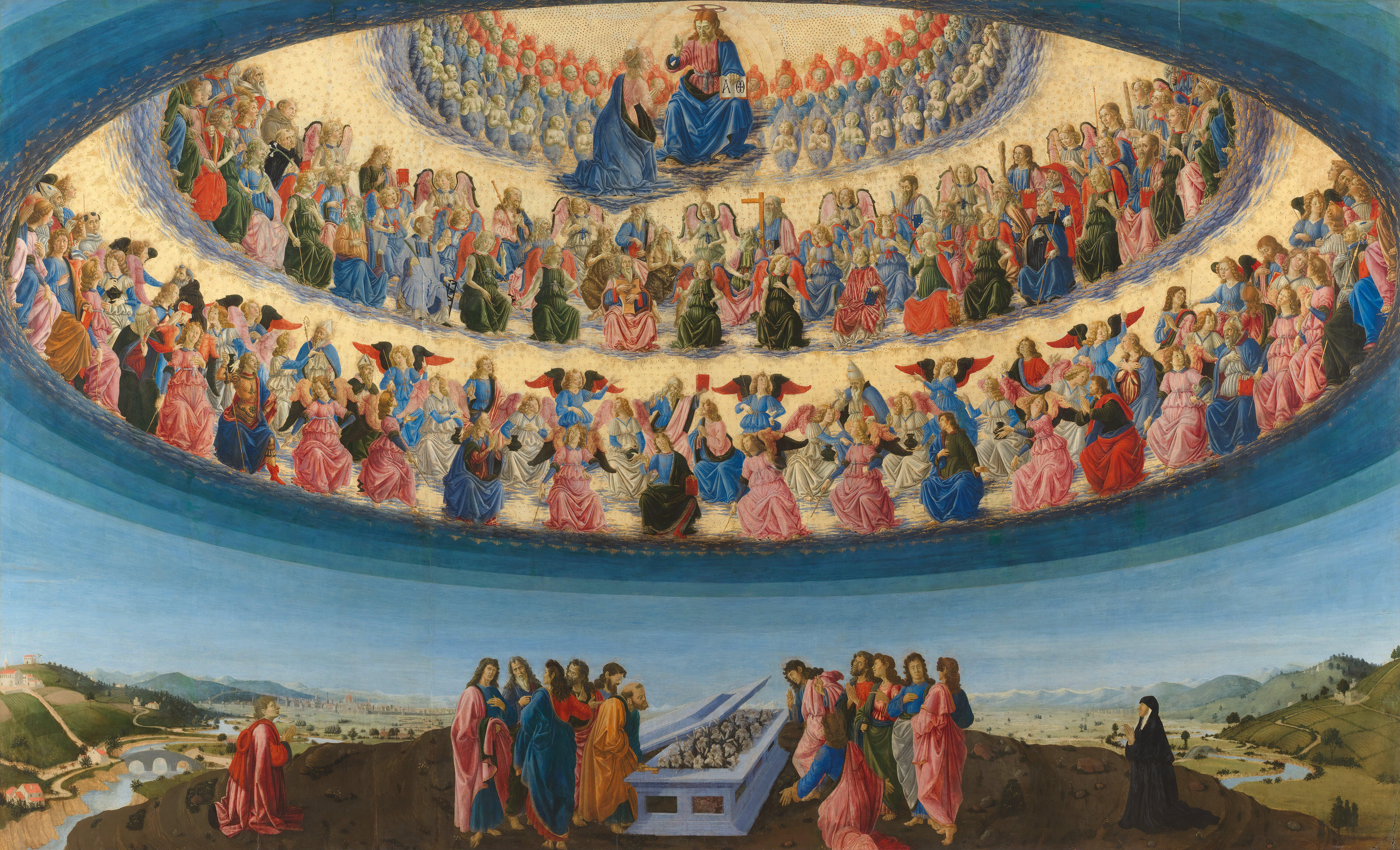
Assumption of the Virgin, by Francesco Botticini, 1475-77 (National Gallery, London)

== Works ==
Palmieri firmly believed in the humanist ideal that virtù was a combination of both learning and political action, and so in concordance with his political life, he was also an author. He wrote in both Latin and Italian. Among his Latin works are Liber de temporibus (Book of Epochs), a universal chronicle of the world from the time of creation to his present day; the De captivitate liber (The Capture of Pisa), an account of the Florentine capture of Pisa in 1406; and a biography of Niccolò Acciaioli, translated into Italian by Donato Acciaioli.

In 1465, Palmieri wrote a three-book poem in Italian titled Città di vita ("The City of Life"), which is an imitation of Dante Alighieri's Divine Comedy. The poem was unpublished in his lifetime, and upon its appearance in print was condemned by the Church as heretical, thus after his death Palmieri's body was removed from the Church of San Pier Maggiore and an effigy of him was burned.

Palmieri's best-known work as a humanist is Della vita civile ("On Civic Life"; printed 1528), composed in 1429 and circulated between 1435 and 1440. It is a treatise discussing the qualities of the ideal citizen; written as series of dialogues in four books. The dialogues are set in a country house in Mugello during the plague of 1430, with Agnolo Pandolfini, a rich Florentine merchant, as the main speaker. Depending for the first dialogue upon Quintilian's Institutio oratoria and for the last three on Cicero's De officiis, it discusses the physical and intellectual development of children, the moral life of a citizen, and the contrasting tensions between what is useful and what is honest. As well as classic writers such as Cicero, Quintilian and Plutarch, it draws on Palmieri's own personal experiences as a civil servant. His primary emphasis and advocacy is on the need for a good education and taking an active part in the life of the city. He considered education at an early age a crucial aspect of ones life because it improves the human capacity to do good for others and the community.
