= Villa Pandolfini =

Coordinates: 43.7703°N 11.0927°E

Villa Pandolfini is a Renaissance villa near Florence, Italy in Lastra a Signa, and close to the Arno River.

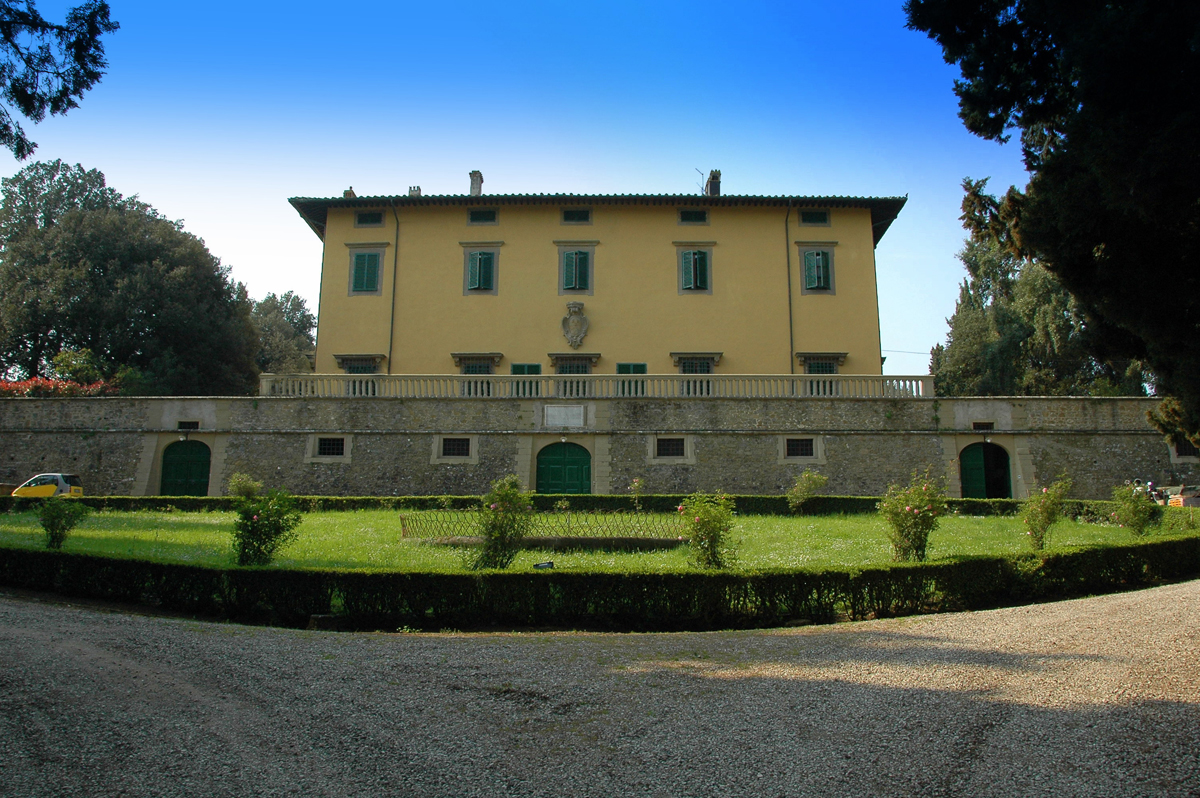
Front view of the Renaissance Villa Pandolfini

== History and description ==
The villa was commissioned by Battista Pandolfini and built in the late 15th century (1485–1488) to a design attributed to Desiderio da Settignano. The Pandolfini family already owned the medieval tower that is currently in front of the main entrance to the villa. Under the ownership of Agnolo Pandolfini, a friend of Cosimo de' Medici, the tower hosted historical figures such as Leon Battista Alberti, Benedetto da Rovezzano, Pope Eugene IV, Renais D'Anjou, Francesco Sforza. The presence in the villa of Charles VIII of France is documented in 1495, just before he was about to enter Florence with his army.

Villa Pandolfini remained substantially the same until the 17th century, when Filippo Pandolfini made some alterations: constructing a large terrace on the main facade towards the Via Livornese, and the chapel. The arrangement of the garden dates from 1633. The solidity of the structural works appears when the changes are compared with the plan of the villa designed by Giovanni Vasari The Young at the end of the 16th century, at any time prior to the restoration.

Today, Villa Pandolfini has an interior design consistent with Italian 19th century taste. The living room overlooking the loggia has a frescoed ceiling with bucolic subjects typical of a neo-classicism Arcadian hunting scene. The Ducessois-Prat family, arrived in Italy after the French Revolution, took over from the Pandolfinis and the Samminiatelli family, and made further changes: 19th century restorations are visible in the garden, especially in the Rocaille pavilion.

In the last decades, Villa Pandolfini returned to an Italian owner, the Brogi family, and it currently houses the "Azienda Agricola Marchesi Prat" and the Italian Academy of Cuisine Pandolfini, founded in the 1990s.
