= Giovanni del Biondo =

14th-century Italian painter mainly known for his panel paintings

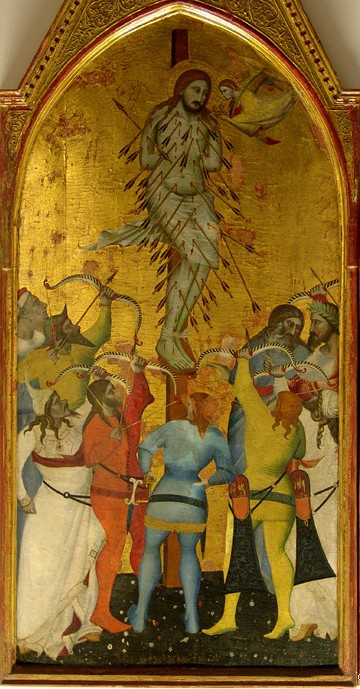
Martyrdom of St Sebastian

Giovanni del Biondo was a 14th-century Italian painter of the Gothic and early-Renaissance period. He was active in the period 1356-1399 and is mainly known for his panel paintings. He specialized in religious-themed works, many of which have survived.

== Early life and education ==
Del Biondo's precise date of birth is unknown. From tax records, it is known that Giovanni del Biondo lived and flourished in Florence, where he died in 1399.

He may have trained in the workshop of Andrea and Nardo di Cione, where he also worked at the start of his career.

== Career ==
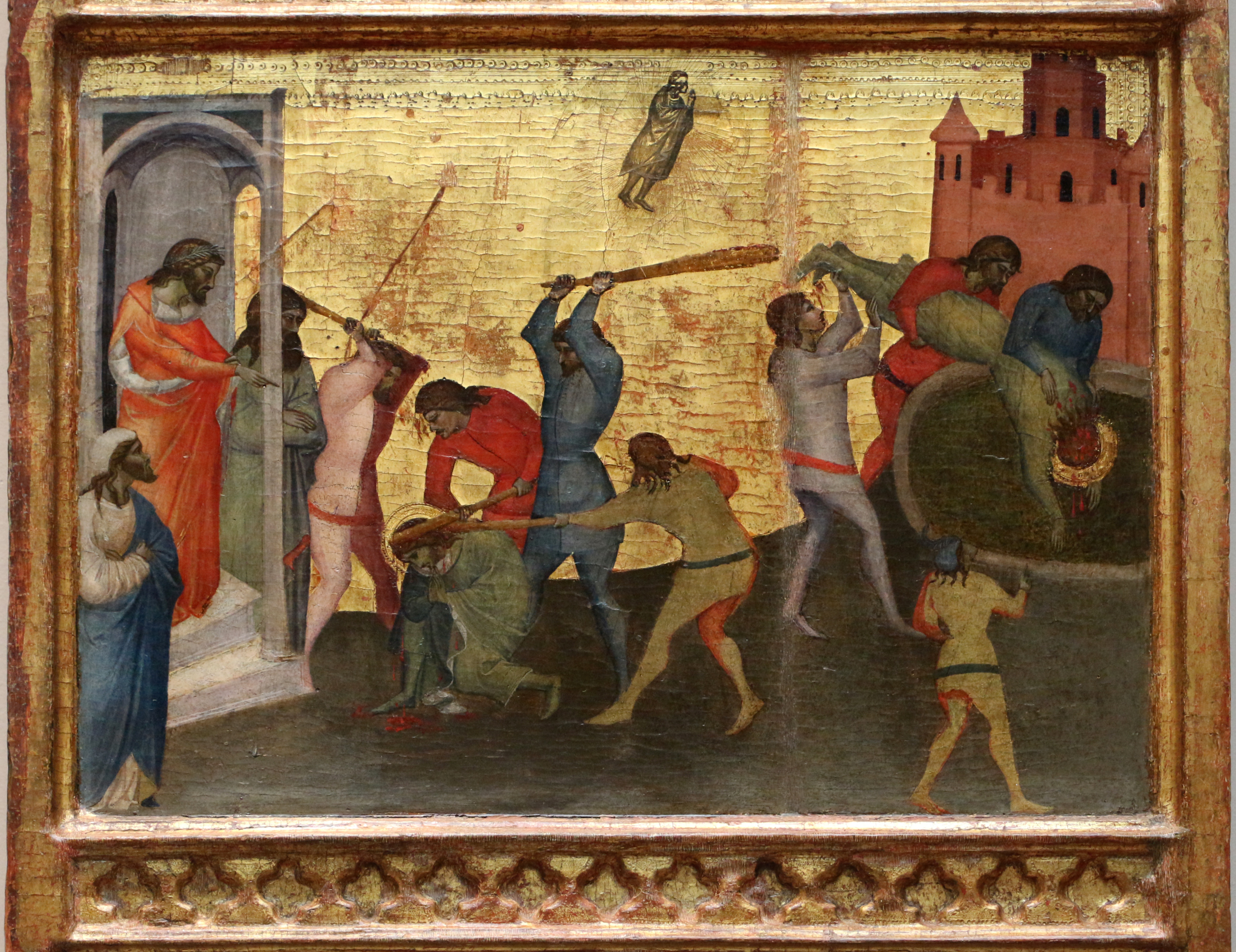
From the Saint Sebastian Triptych

His earliest surviving works are frescoes. These works clearly bear the mark of the influence of Giotto's style. He later started making tempera paintings on panels. These works often show the influence of the works of Ambrogio Lorenzetti, Andrea di Cione, Jacopo di Cione and Bernardo Daddi. Nearly all of Biondo's paintings depict religious subjects and were originally part of large-scale polyptych altarpieces.

His earliest works are simple compositions with bright colors and typically lack dimensional depth. Gradually Biondo's figures gained more ornamentation and detail and a more naturalistic appearance. The figures also became more spontaneous in their arrangements. In his later paintings, Biondo paid more attention to foreground and background details in his composition. He created a greater sense of depth but his figures became more formalized and hardened.

The idiosyncrasies of his style include the wayward proportions, sharp, spiky features and a strong sense of design. There are only two surviving altarpieces that bear his signature. Because of his distinctive style it has been possible to confidently ascribe a significant number of works to the artist.

His style remained the same in his later career. The use of studio assistants with various levels of proficiency in his later period led to a certain loss in quality. There are two paragons of Giovanni del Biondo's style of painting in the Art Gallery of Ontario in Toronto, Vision of Saint Benedict, "Saint Benedict Restores Life to Monk. Another Dei Biondo painting, Madonna with God and the Father, is housed at the Memorial Art Gallery at the University of Rochester in Rochester, New York.The Detroit Institute of Art has two paintings by this Late Gothic Period Italian Painter,"Virgin Annunciate"and Archangel Annunciate".
