= Jacopo di Cione =

Italian Gothic period painter (c. 1325–c. 1399)

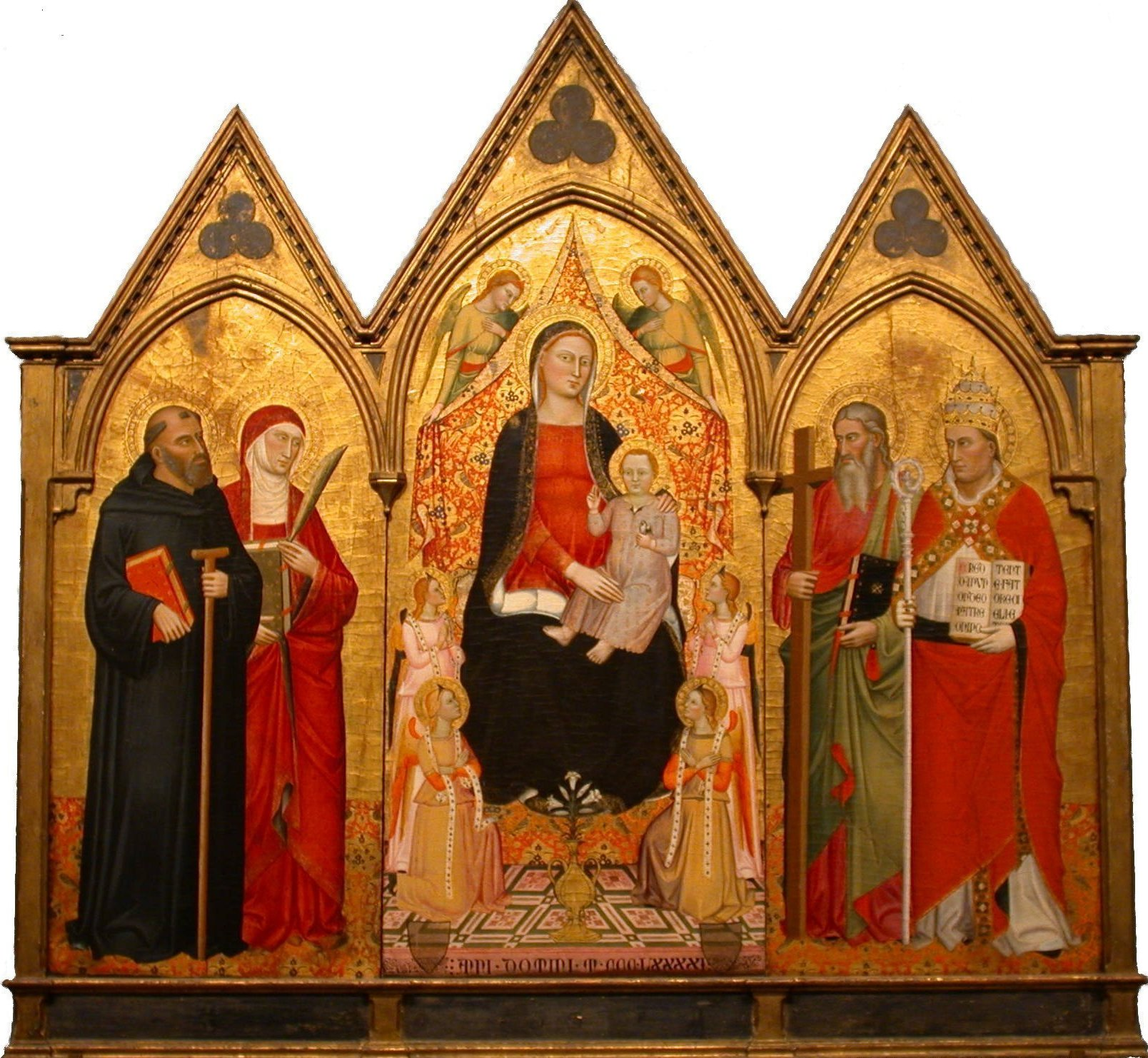
Madonna and Child with Saints, tempera and gold on panel by Jacopo di Cione, 1391, Honolulu Museum of Art. This triptych once hung in the Church of San Lorenzo, Florence. The four saints may represent (from left to right) St. Amata, St. Concordia, St. Andrew, and Pope St. Mark, each of whose relics are in San Lorenzo.

Jacopo di Cione (c. 1325 – c. 1399) was an Italian Gothic period painter in the Republic of Florence.

== Life and career ==
Born in Florence between 1320 and 1330, he is closely associated with his three older brothers Andrea di Cione di Arcangelo (called Orcagna), Nardo di Cione and Matteo di Cione. The di Cione (pronounced dee choh’ nay) brothers often worked collaboratively. Jacopo lived in the popolo Sancte Marie Novelle and, later in life, in the popolo Sancti Laurentii.

In 1366–68 Jacopo worked on a large chamber in the guildhall of the judges and notaries, Florence (a surviving altarpiece with Crucifixion is in the National Gallery, London). After Andrea's death in 1368 Jacopo took over some of his brother's commissions, for example guaranteeing to complete a painting of the Virgin and assuming responsibility for the altarpiece of St Matthew, both for the Orsanmichele, Florence. He enrolled in the Arte dei Medici e Speziali in 1369, and was one of the consuls of the guild in 1384, 1387 and 1392.

Jacopo also worked regularly with the painter Niccolò di Pietro Gerini. In 1370–71 they produced the polyptych for the high altar of the church of San Pier Maggiore, Florence. Niccolò was paid for the overall design, while Jacopo seems to have been responsible for the narratives. The altarpiece is one of the largest commissioned in fourteenth-century Florence, and was probably commissioned by the Albizzi family. The twelve main panels of the altarpiece are in the National Gallery, London, but the predella showing scenes from the life of Saint Peter has been dispersed. The two painters again collaborated in 1372–73 on the large panel of the Coronation of the Virgin commissioned by the mint of Florence, and in 1386 they received the commission for a fresco of the Annunciation for the council chamber in the Palazzo dei Priori, Volterra.

Between 1378 and 1380 Jacopo worked in the Florence Cathedral – he is recorded as Matteo guarantor – and continued to procure marble for the cathedral workshop after his brother's death. Later Jacopo probably also executed gilding decoration for twelve marble statues for the jamb of the main porch, and completed other work in the cathedral. In 1382 and 1385 Jacopo is recorded working at the Loggia dei Priori, Florence, and in 1386 he provided four panel paintings to the Avignon office of the merchant Francesco di Marco Datini from Prato. In 1391 Jacopo painted the altar for the Church of San Lorenzo in Florence (now in the Honolulu Museum of Art). He died in Florence, after 2 May 1398 and before 1400.

== Claims for restitution ==
In 2020 di Cione's Madonna Nursing the Christ Child with Saints Lawrence and Margaret was the object of a settlement between the estate of Hester Diamond and heir of August Liebmann Mayer, a German Jewish art historian and curator who was killed at Auschwitz in 1944.

== Gallery ==
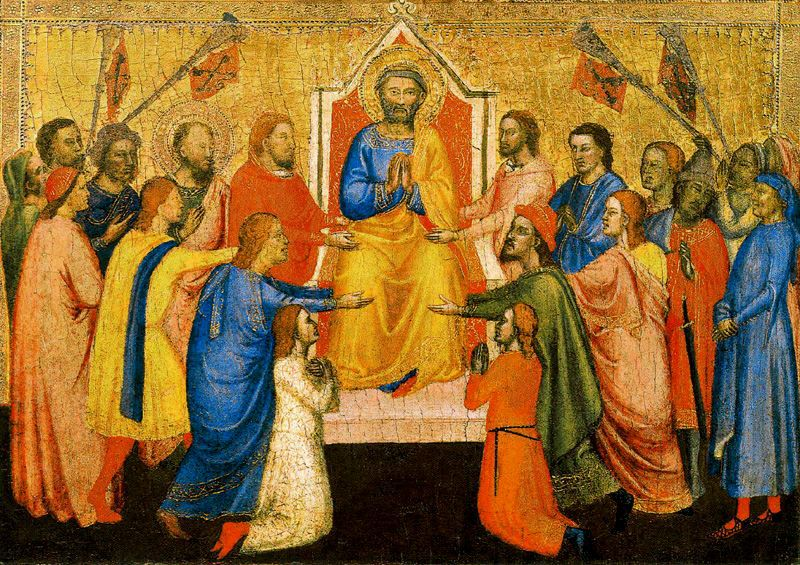
St. Peter Enthroned Between St. Paul and the Faithful, tempera on wood panel painting by Jacopo di Cione, 1370–1, the Vatican Museums

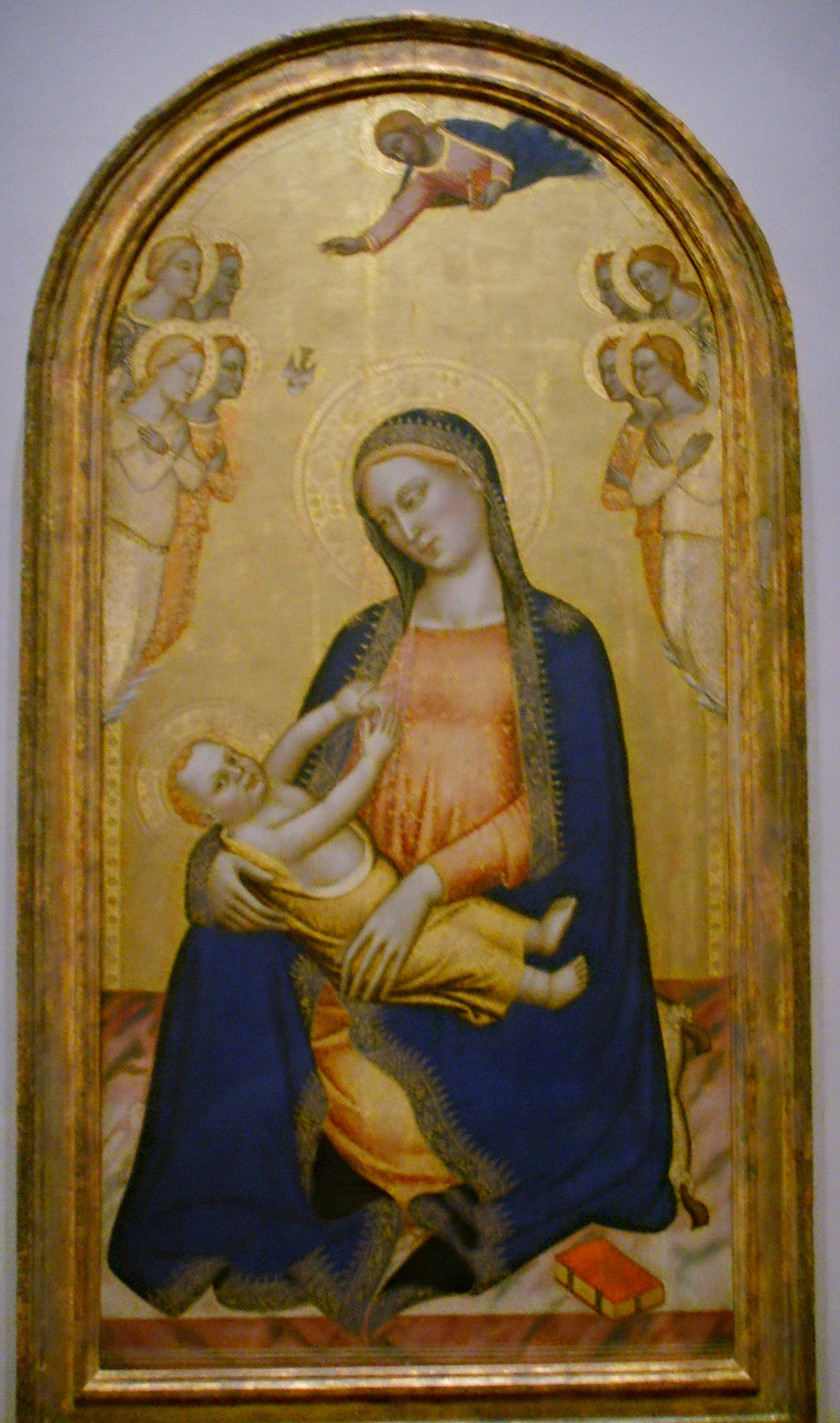
Madonna and Child with Angels, by Andrea Orcagna and Jacopo di Cione, c. 1317, National Gallery of Art (Washington DC)

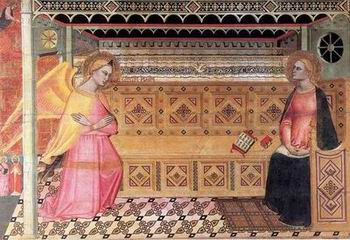
The Annunciation by Jacopo di Cione

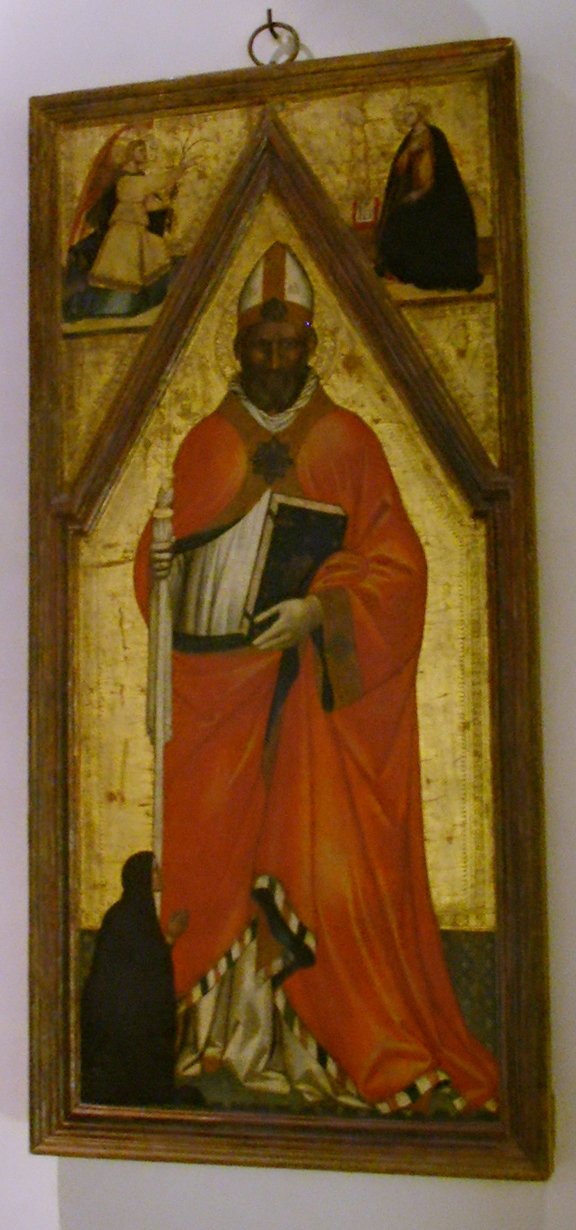
San Zanobi e una devota by Jacopo di Cione

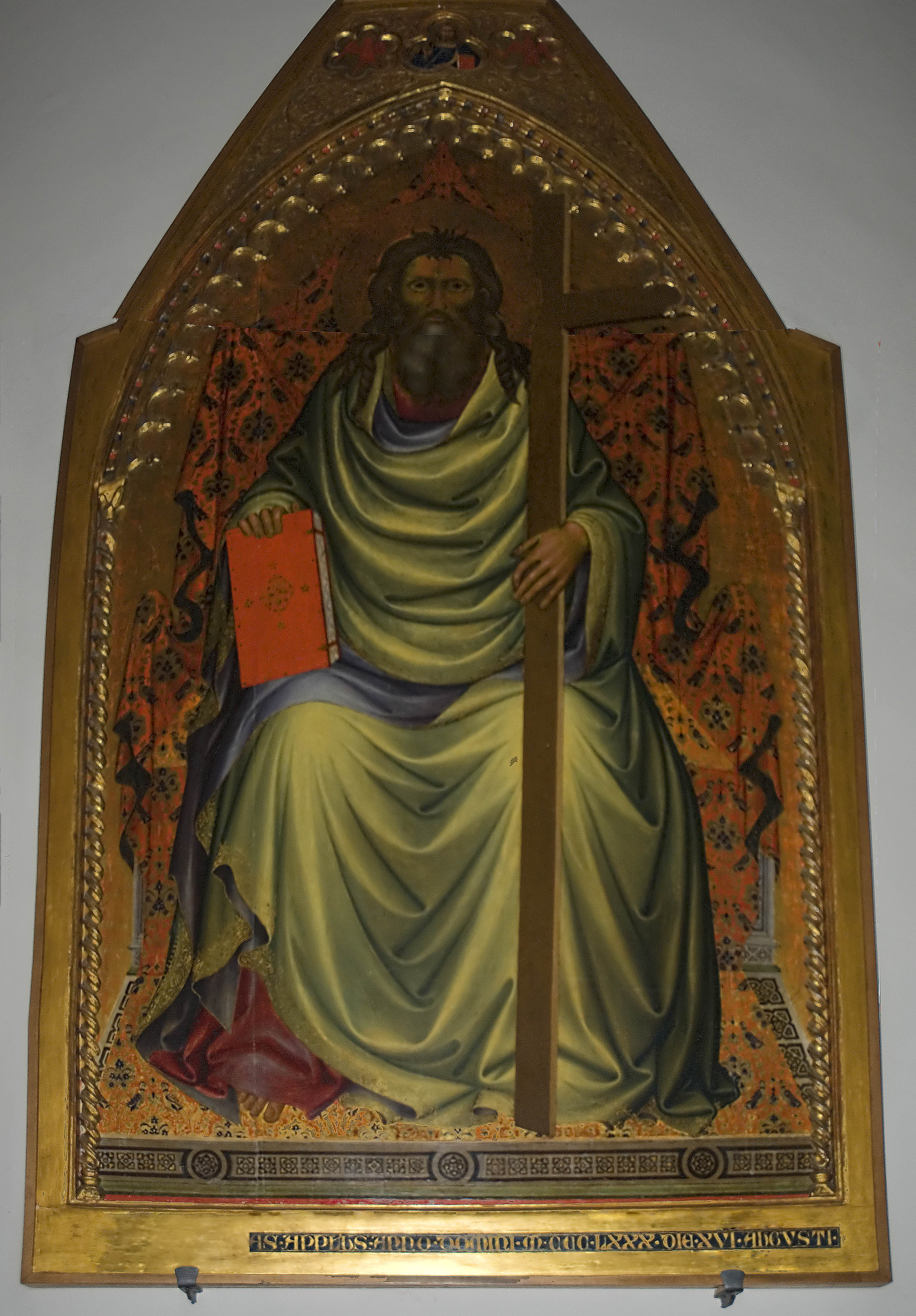
San Casciano in Val di Pesa by Giovanni del Biondo and Jacopo di Cione

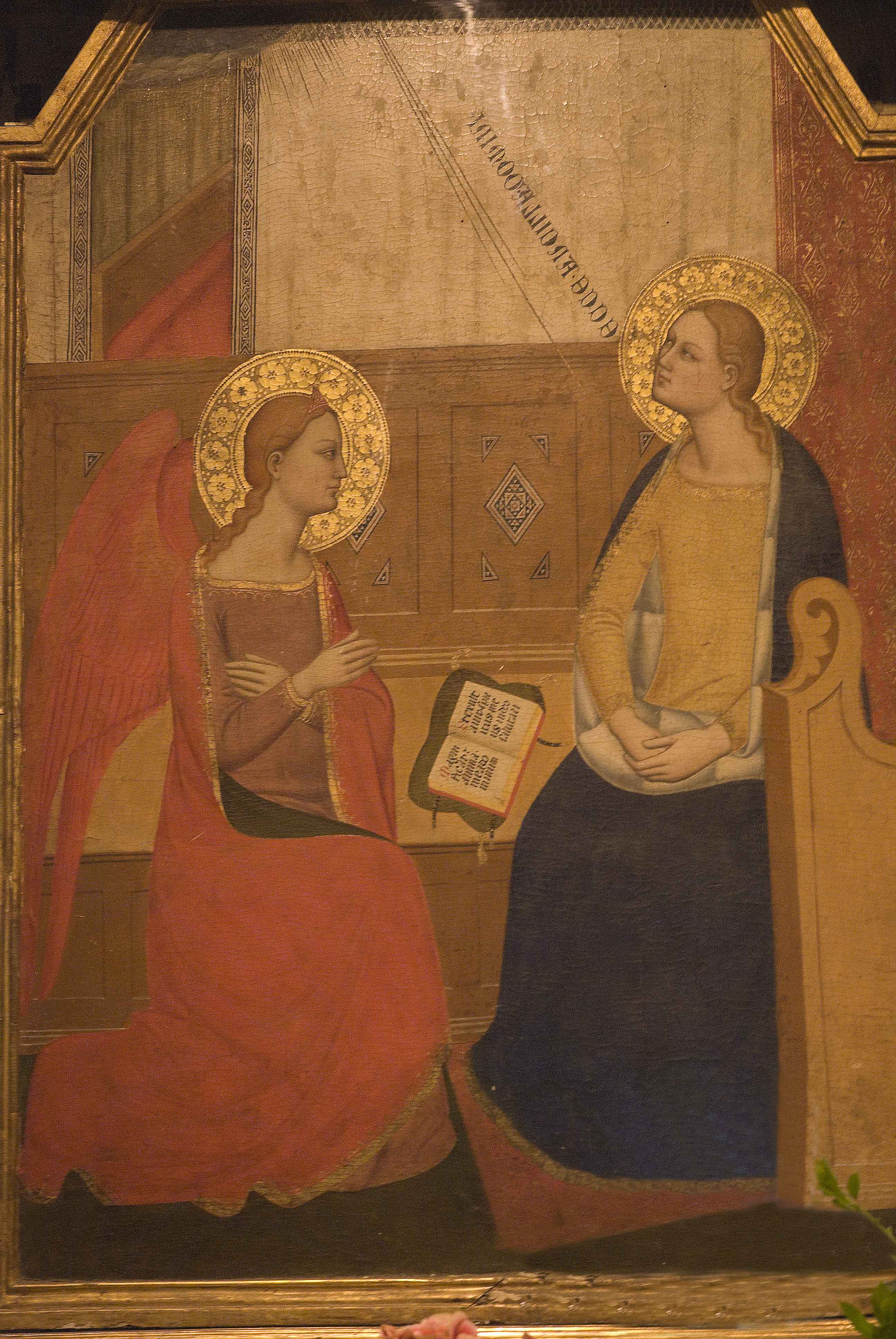
The Annunciation by Jacopo di Cione, with upside down lettering

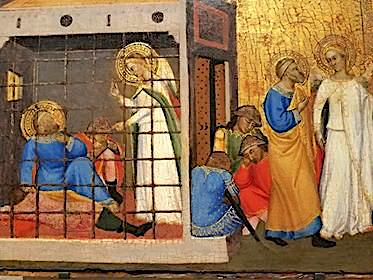
Apostle Peter Released from Prison, Jacopo di Cione, 1370-1371 (Philadelphia Museum of Art)
