= San Pier Maggiore, Florence =

Former church and monastery

Coordinates: 43.7713°N 11.2618°E

San Pier Maggiore was a church and monastery in Florence, Tuscany, central Italy that existed from the eleventh to the eighteenth century, and hosted ceremonies for the reception of newly appointed Bishops of Florence.

== History of the building ==
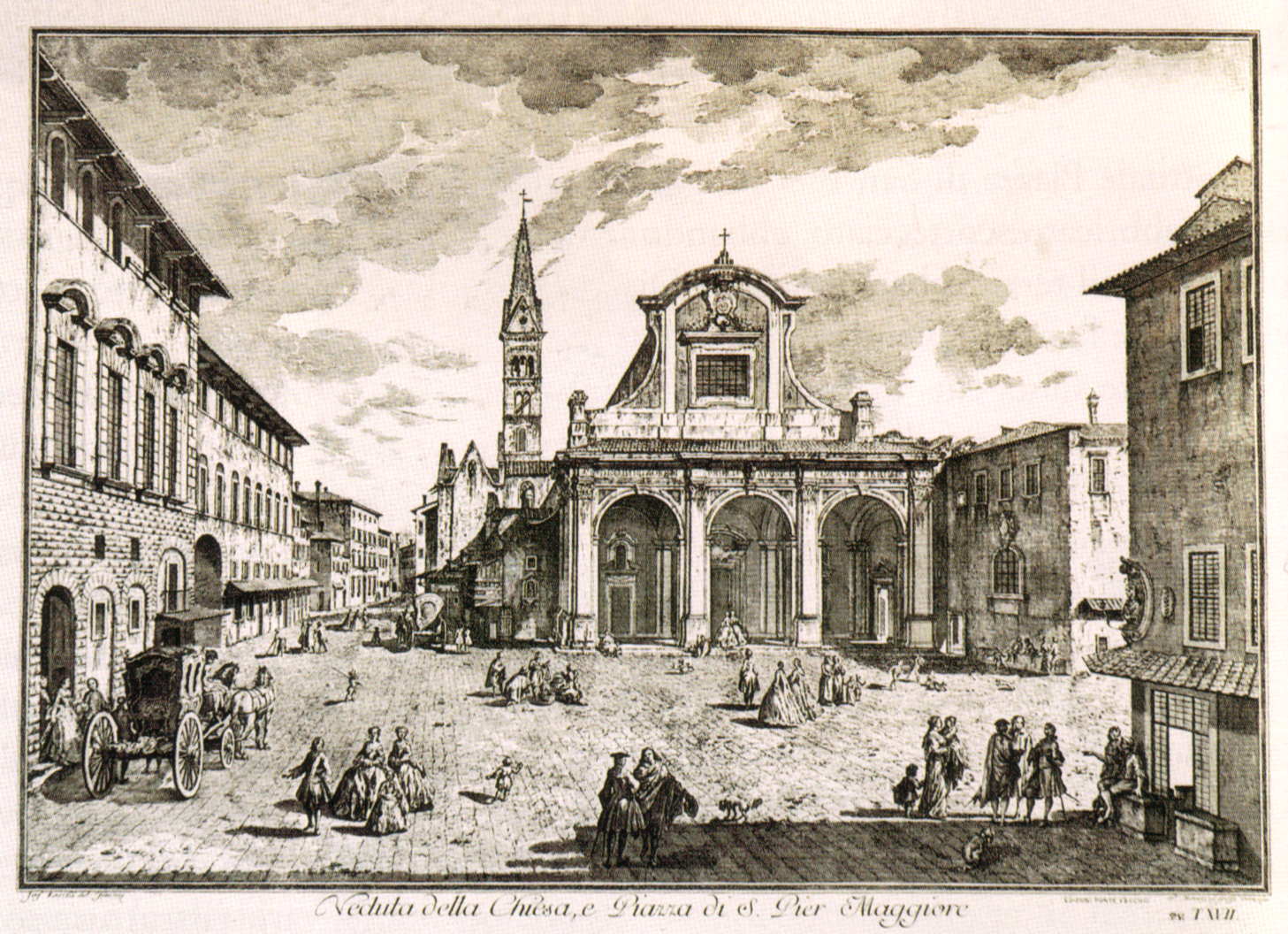
Giuseppe Zocchi, View of the church in 1744

A church was already present at the site when a Benedictine convent was established there in 1067 by the Florentine noblewoman Gisla and the then-Bishop Peter Mezzabarba, and a Gothic church was built here in the early fourteenth century. The Florentine government almost entirely removed this church in 1784 and replaced it with a marketplace, although three arches of the portico have been preserved into the twenty-first century.

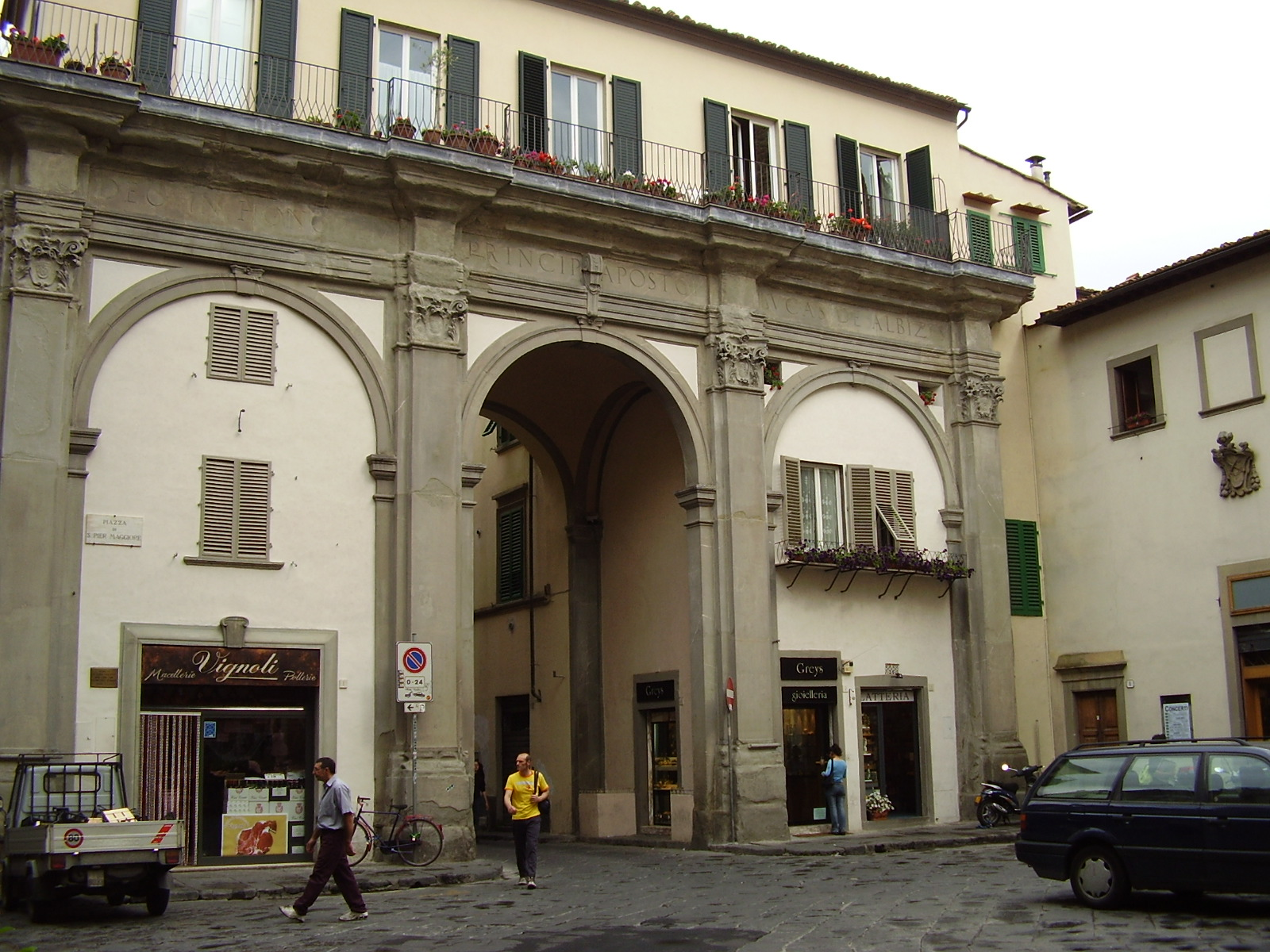
Three arches of the portico which remained after demolition

== The church and social life ==
The church of San Pier Maggiore played a role in a ritual that was performed every time a new bishop of Florence was appointed. Traditionally, from the late thirteenth century until the late sixteenth century, the newly appointed bishop would ride in a procession with his attendants to the plaza outside San Pier Maggiore. There, the bishop and abbess of San Pier Maggiore gave gifts to each other, with the bishop usually giving his horse to the abbess. In return, the nuns of the convent gifted the bishop a bed which they had paid for and furnished. Next, the bishop entered the church and attended a banquet provided by the nuns of San Pier Maggiore. After the banquet came a ceremony where the newly appointed bishop gave a special ring to the abbess of the convent; Strocchia cites contemporary accounts that view this act as the bishop being married to the church of Florence. Last, in this ceremony, the bishop would spend his first night in the city in the church – he would sleep in the bed that the nuns had gifted to him, before proceeding the next day to lead prayers at different churches.

The abbess of San Pier Maggiore – who, as Miller notes, usually belonged to one of the most socially prominent families in Florence – had considerable freedom to direct the flow of this ceremony from its inception until the late fifteenth century, when her powers were limited by subsequent bishops. She could negotiate with the bishop to reaffirm the taxation privileges of the convent, limit the number of people who could accompany the bishop during the lunch, and otherwise defend the social standing of S. Pier Maggiore in the city. Although verbal negotiations were the norm, sometimes physical conflict erupted over access to the bishop, such as in the 1380s when the bishop's attendants and the church staff of San Pier Maggiore fought over who could help seat the bishop in the church. Strocchia and Miller have interpreted the entire marriage ritual as the process by which the bishop made himself known to and established clear relations with wealthy Florentine families – through the giving of gifts, the banquet, and the bishop's sleeping overnight in the nunnery-provided bed.

== Art in the church ==
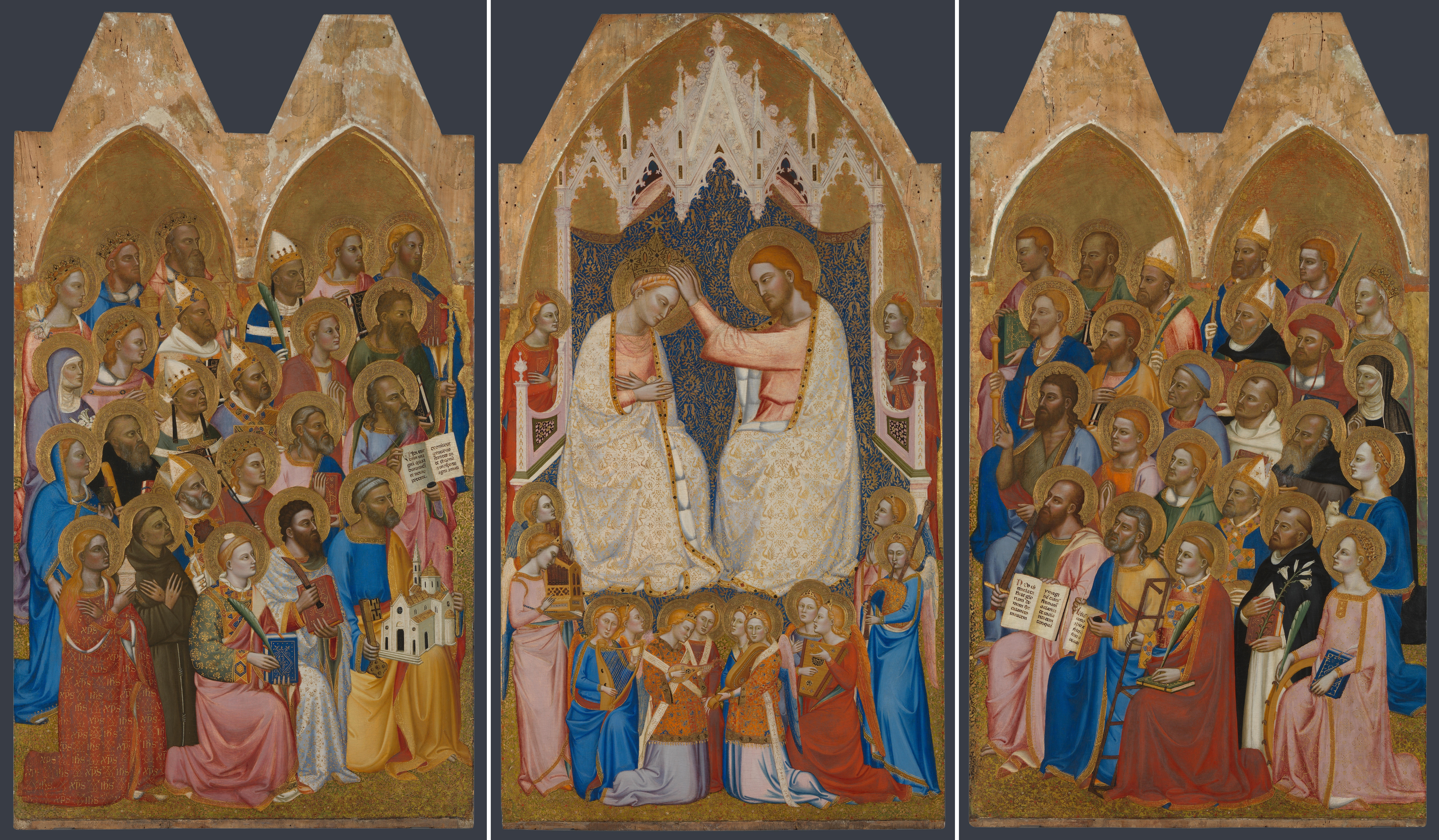
Three centre panels of the altarpiece

The multi-paneled altarpiece by Jacopo di Cione and Niccolò di Pietro Gerini or Niccolò di Tommaso was completed in 1371 (12 of its frames are now held by London's National Gallery).

Other artworks in the church included likely Botticini's Assumption of the Virgin (also in the National Gallery), as well as Francesco Granacci's Assumption of the Virgin (now in the Ringling Museum) and The Visitation by Maso da San Friano (now owned by the Fitzwilliam Museum, though currently loaned to Trinity Hall, Cambridge).
