= 1387 in Italy =

A series of events which occurred in 1387 in Italy:

- Battle of Castagnaro

The Battle of Castagnaro was fought on March 11, 1387, at Castagnaro (today's Veneto, northern Italy) between Verona and Padua. It is one of the most famous battles of the Italian condottieri age.

The army of Verona was led by Giovanni Ordelaffi and Ostasio da Polenta, while the victorious Paduans were commanded by John Hawkwood (Giovanni Acuto) and Francesco Novello Carraresi.

Castagnaro is hailed as Sir John Hawkwood's greatest victory. Following a Fabian-like strategy, Hawkwood goaded the Veronese into attacking him on a field of his own choosing, by laying waste to the Veronese lands nearby.

== Births ==
- Parri Spinelli
- Fra Angelico

== Deaths ==
- Masuccio Segondo
