= Nardo di Cione =

Italian painter

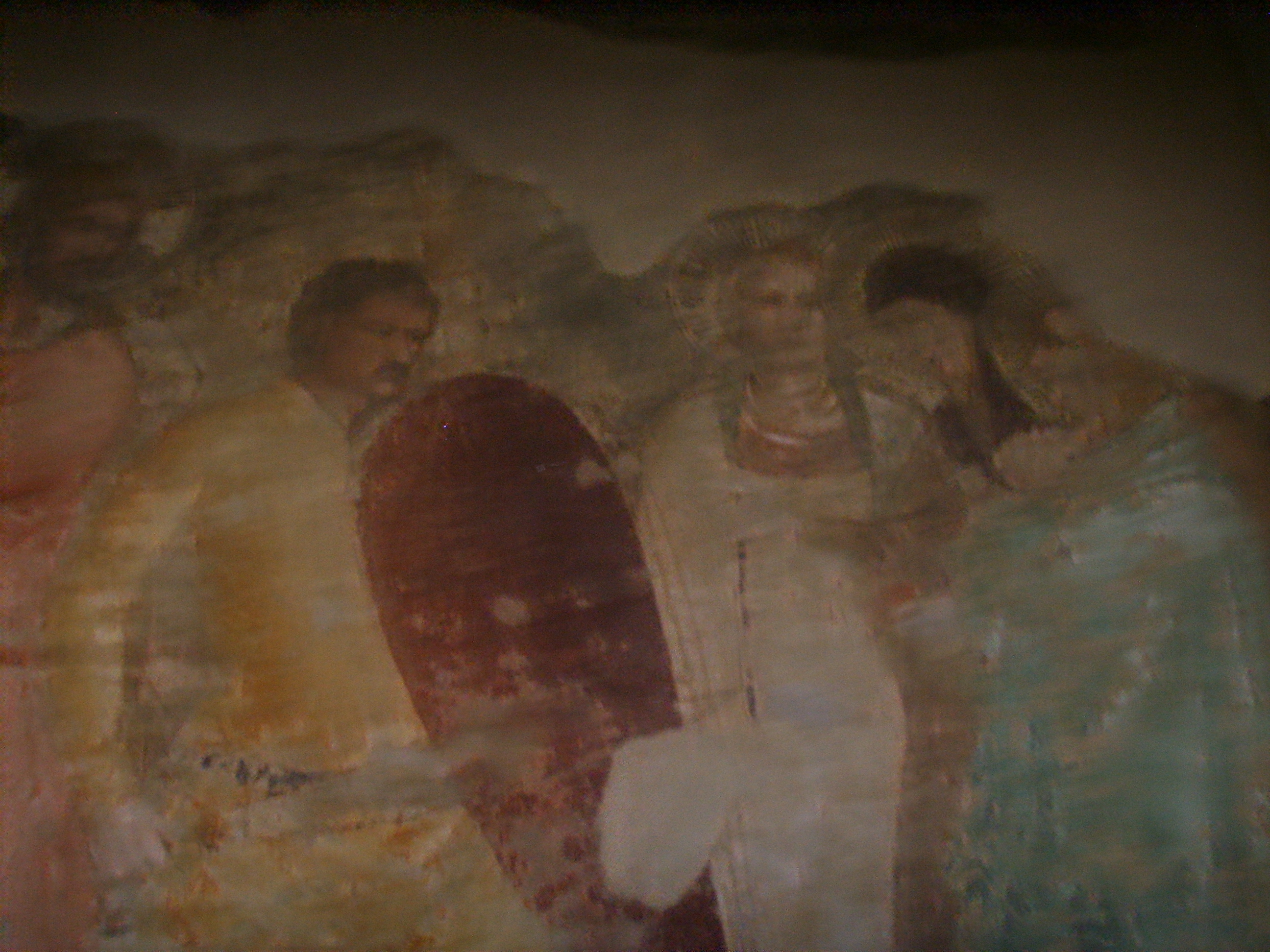
Frescos in the Badia Fiorentina church, Florence, attributed to Nardo di Cione

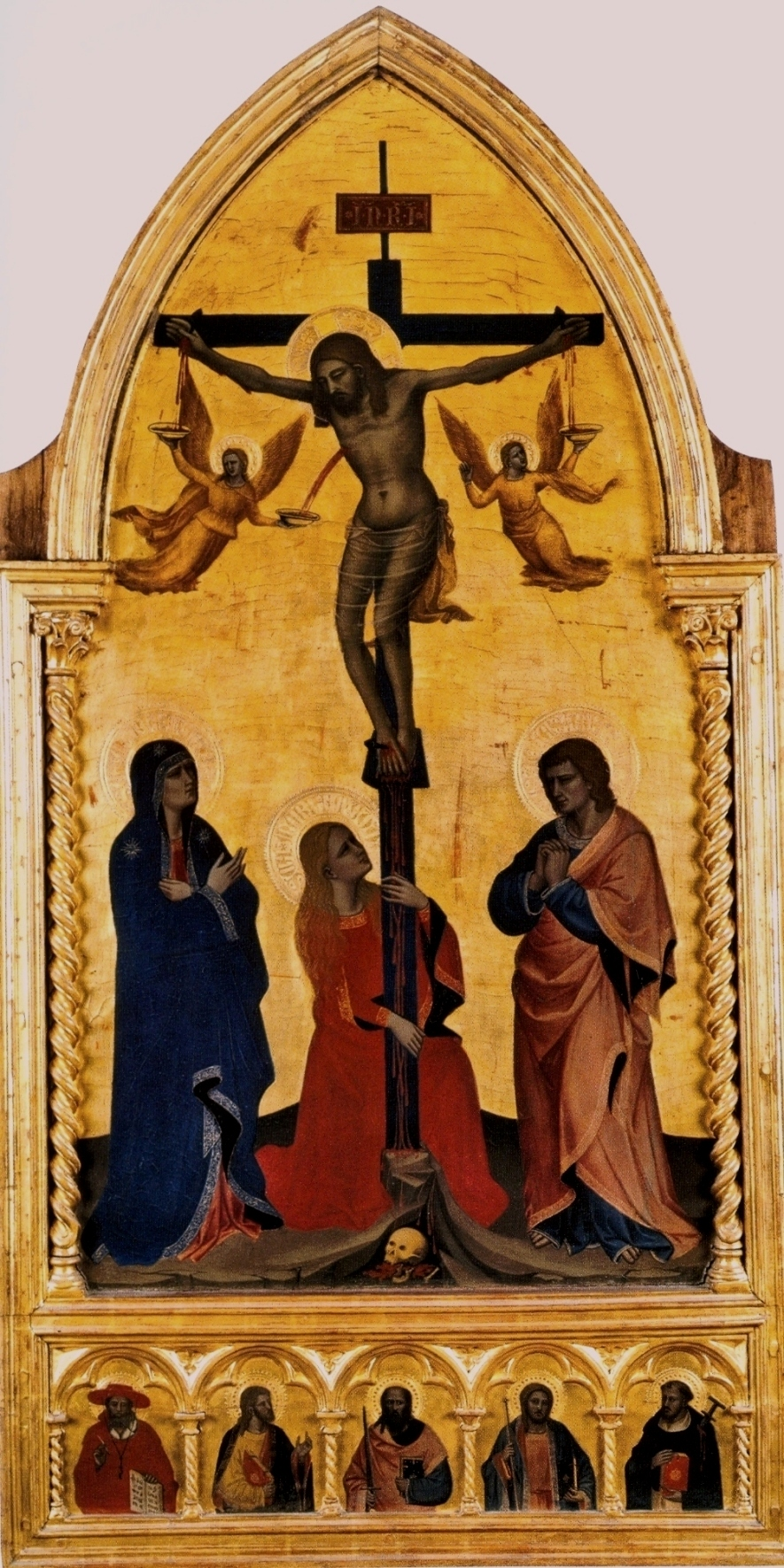
Crucifixion (Uffizi Gallery)

Nardo di Cione (died c. 1366) was an Italian painter, sculptor and architect from Florence. He was the brother of the more accomplished Andrea di Cione, called Orcagna, as well as Jacopo di Cione; they were important members of the Painters guild of Florence. While Orcagna has been noted as the more accomplished artist, Nardo developed his own unique style, described as "a pronounced lyrical vein, a feeling for poetic values, strong human sympathies and great sensitivity to colour as a means of subtle differentiation and soft modeling".

== Life ==
The Di Cione brothers collaborated on a number of works from their studio together, including the decorations from the Cappella Strozzi in Santa Maria Novella. While Orcagna painted the altarpiece, Nardo executed the frescoes of The Last Judgment, Paradise and Hell.

Of Nardo's independently attributed works is his Crucifixion, a central panel of a tabernacle. In the predella of the piece are depictions of Saints Jerome, James the Less, Saint Paul, James the Great and Saint Peter the Martyr. The work is of unknown origin, but was acquired from the Accademia in Florence and now in the Uffizi Gallery.

There is also Nardo's Standing Madonna with Child, executed sometime in the 1350s. This piece has been noted of works created in Florence after the ravages of the bubonic plague of 1348, where religious art was commissioned in order to bring spiritual relief to the survivors. This Standing Madonna is very similar to the surviving work of Nardo’s smaller devotional pieces for the home, one of which is housed in the National Gallery of Art, Madonna and Child with Saints Peter and John the Evangelist.
