= Agnolo Pandolfini =

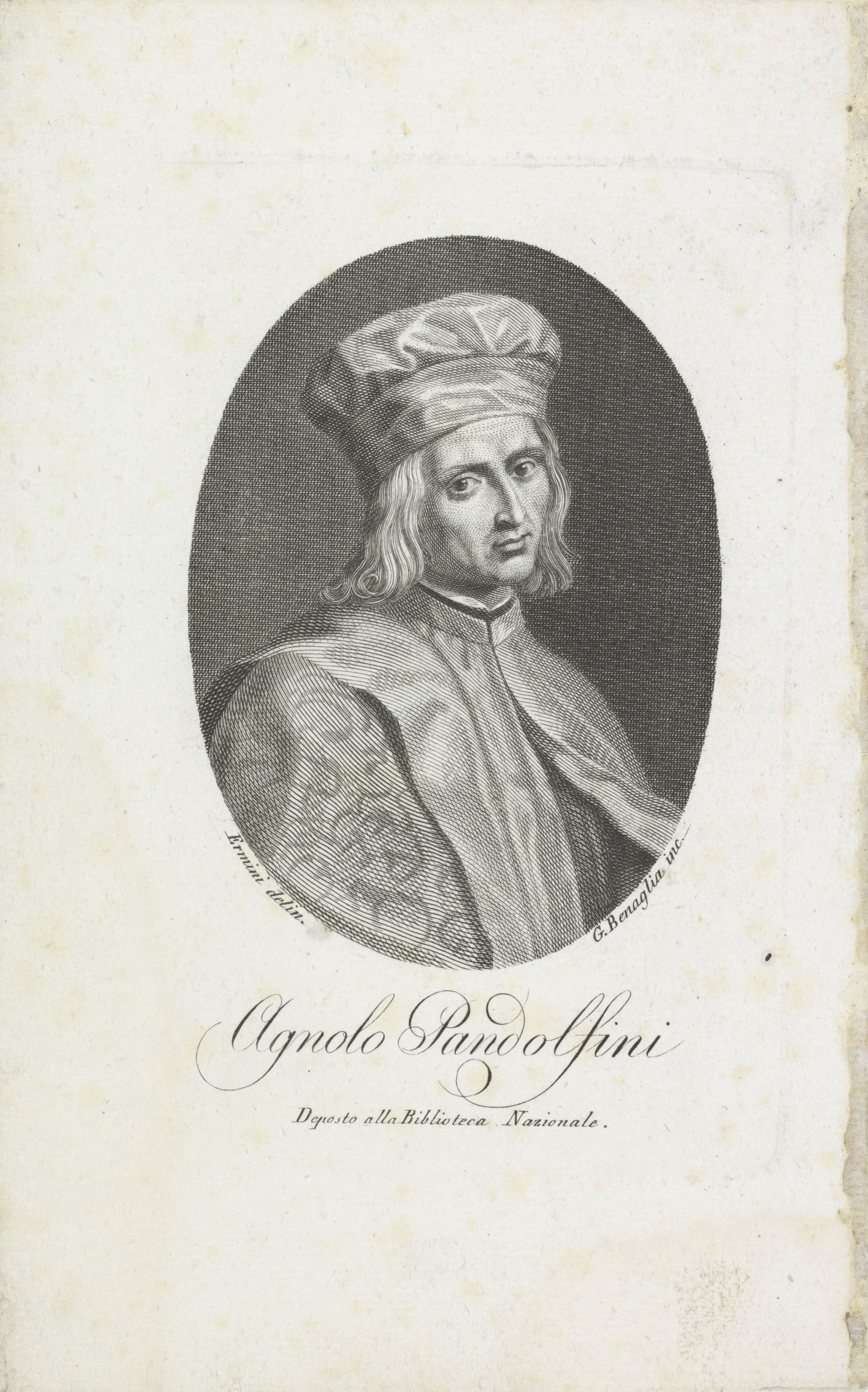
Agnolo Pandolfini

Agnolo Pandolfini (1360-1446) was a Florentine statesman, merchant and Renaissance humanist.

He was considered a highly learned man, erudite in Latin and a friend to most of the learned Florentines of his era. Leonardo Bruni was said to have published nothing which had not first obtained a favorable review from Agnolo. His erudition and high standing in Florentine society is evinced by his appearance as the chief speaker in two dialogues of his day: Della vita civile by Matteo Palmieri, and Della tranquilità dell'animo by Leon Battista Alberti. He was related by marriage to many of the leading families of Florence.

== Origin and political life ==
His grandfather, Ser Giovanni, moved from Signa to Florence around the beginning of the 14th century and was a notary. His son, Agnolo's father, named Filippo, was a wealthy merchant of the Por Santa Maria guild who probably dealt in silks and spices; he later joined the Signoria of Florence and, in 1393 and in 1400, became Gonfalonier.

Agnolo himself served in many political offices, becoming a major figure of the first half of the 15th century in Florence. He was Gonfalonier on three occasions, a member of the decem baliae twice, and was often invited to participate in executive councils, the so-called Consulte e Pratiche.

== Literature ==
- Martines, Lauro (2011). The Social World of the Florentine Humanists, 1390-1460. University of Toronto Press. pp. 313-314.
