= Botticini =

Botticini is an Italian surname. Notable people with the surname include:

- Francesco Botticini (1446–1498), Italian painter
- Raffaello Botticini (1474–1520), Italian painter, son of Francesco

== See also ==
- Bottici
