= Nélie Jacquemart =

French painter

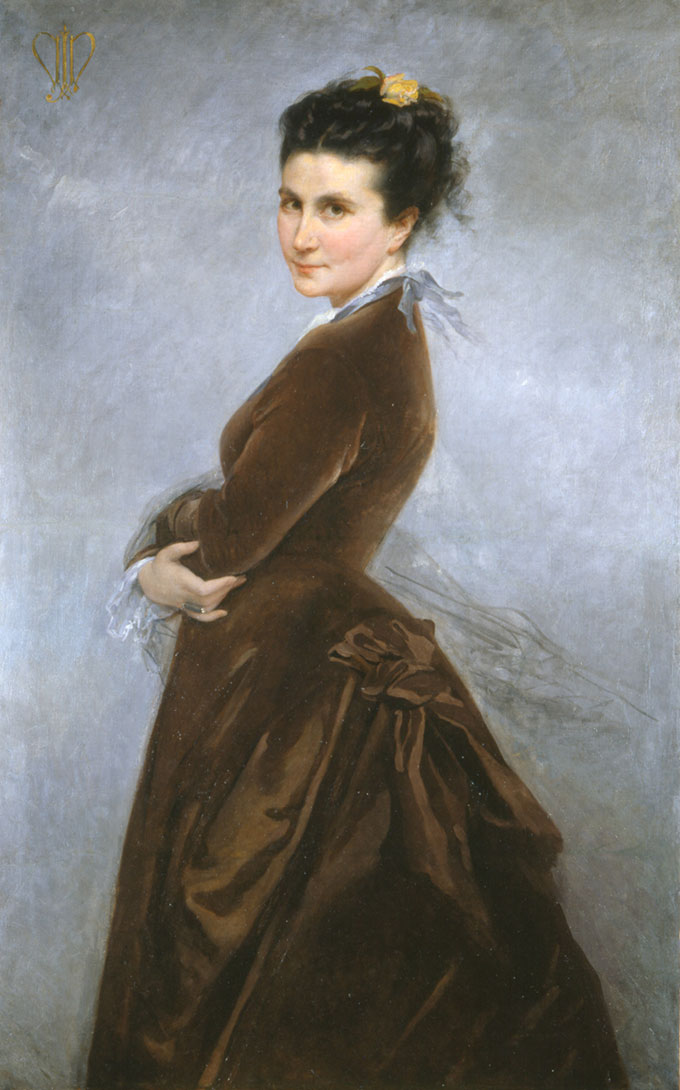
Self-portrait

Cornélie Barbe Hyacinthe Jacquemart (French pronunciation: [kɔʁneli baʁb jasɛ̃t ʒakmaʁ]), known as Nélie ([neli]; 25 July 1841– 15 May 1912) was a French painter, art collector and patron of the arts.

== Biography ==
Cornélie Barbe Hyacinthe Jacquemart was born in Paris, where her parents had moved from Meurthe in 1835 so that her father, Joseph, could work as a "relais" (a type of campaign worker) for Alphée Bourdon de Vatry, a local candidate for National Deputy. Her mother, Marie, may have been a milliner and her father appears to have died shortly after her birth. Much is uncertain, as she later destroyed many early documents, to conceal her plebeian origins.

When Jacquemart displayed an early talent for art, she became a protégée of De Vatry's wife, Paméla Hainguerlot, and spent summers at their hunting lodge in the former Chaalis Abbey. There, she developed her drawing skills and met many prominent figures who had been involved in the Bourbon Restoration. Thanks to Mme. de Vatry, she was able to study in the workshop of Léon Cogniet, a Professor at the École nationale supérieure des beaux-arts, which did not accept female students at that time. The lessons were given by Cogniet's sister, Marie-Amélie, and consisted largely of copying Cogniet's works.

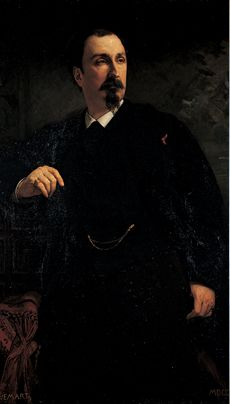
Portrait of Édouard André

Her first public exposure came from an unusual source. In 1858, Malka Kachwar, the Queen of Oudh, died in Paris on her way home from London. She was buried with great ceremony at Père-Lachaise. Jacquemart was there, with Léon Cogniet, and created numerous sketches of the event. An editor at L'Illustration named Aristide Merille had them made into lithographs by Évremond de Bérard and Jules Worms and published them in the magazine later that year.

Jaquemart first showing at the Salon came in 1863 when she was only twenty-two. She received several commissions as a result. At the Salon of 1866, one of her works was purchased by the government and was on display at the Palais des Tuileries until it and the building were destroyed during the Commune. In 1867, she was able to travel to Italy, where she studied with Ernest Hébert, Director of the Académie de France à Rome. While she was there, she befriended Geneviève Bréton, a relative of Louis Hachette, who kept a detailed diary that sheds light on Jacquemart's character and activities. Through Bréton, she met the writer Albert Duruy, son of the Minister of Education, Victor Duruy, whose portrait she painted. After that, according to Bréton, she thought of little but getting married. Her portrait of Duruy was awarded a medal at the Salon of 1870.

=== Art collector ===
Shortly after, the Franco-Prussian War began. Among its victims was her friend, the painter Henri Regnault, who died defending Paris. She continued to paint, however. After the war, she was commissioned to do a portrait of President Adolphe Thiers. She also did a portrait of the art collector, Édouard André. Nine years later, she married him 1881, although there is no evidence to indicate they had a relationship. He was ill at the time and his family insisted on a marriage contract that established a complete separation of their respective personal properties. Despite this arrangement. their collections, both begun many years before, began to merge. Eventually, she decided to hyphenate her name as Jacquemart-André.

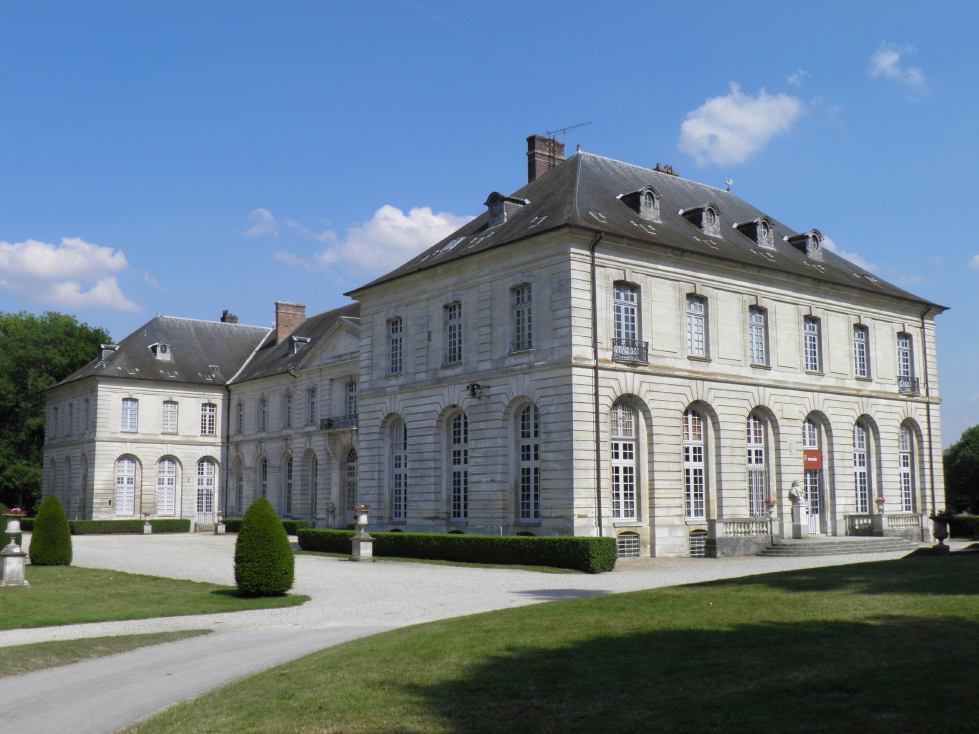
The Museum at Chaalis Abbey

The couple travelled throughout Europe, Egypt and Turkey, adding to their collection. Altogether, they acquired 207 sculptures and 97 paintings. They were particularly interested in Italian Renaissance art and caused a scandal when they bought frescoes by Tiepolo at the Palazzo Contarini-Pisani, near Padua. There was a vitriolic attack in the press and many called for a ban on removing them from Italy. Nevertheless, the frescoes were removed and are now in the couple's townhouse (now the Musée Jacquemart-André) on the Boulevard Haussmann.

After Édouard's death in 1894, she produced a copy of a document giving her possession of the entire joint collection. His family disputed its authenticity, but she won the case. After taking possession, she expanded the collection to include medals and English paintings. In 1902, she discovered that Mme.de Vatry's estate had been sold, including Chaalis Abbey. Luckily, she was able to acquire the Abbey and housed part of her collection there. She also ordered a funerary monument, showing her with palette and brush in hand, although she had painted very little in almost thirty years.

Jacquemart died in 1912, at her home on the Boulevard Haussmann in Paris. She was interred in the chapel at the Abbey, adorned with frescoes by Francesco Primaticcio. In accordance with an agreement she had made with Édouard, all of her possessions were bequeathed to the Institut de France. One year later, two Musées Jacquemart-André were inaugurated and opened to the public; one in Paris and one at the Abbey.
