= Musée Jacquemart-André =

Museum in Paris, France

Jacquemart-André Museum
- Musée Jacquemart-André
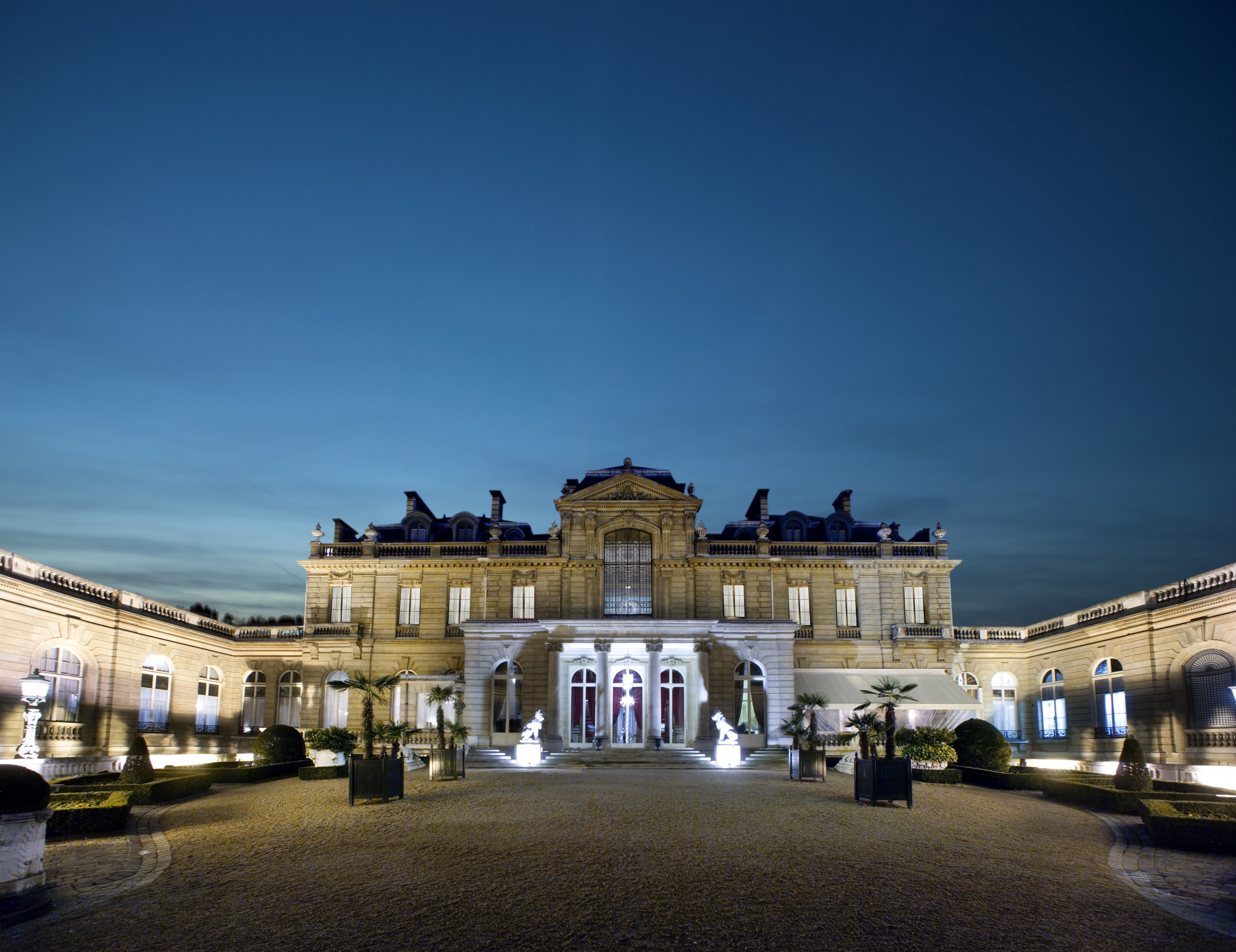
- Musée Jacquemart-André
- Interactive fullscreen map
- Location: Paris, France
- Coordinates: 48°52′32″N 2°18′38″E

The Musée Jacquemart-André (French pronunciation: [myze ʒakmaʁ ɑ̃dʁe], lit. 'Jacquemart-André Museum') is a private museum located at 158 Boulevard Haussmann in the 8th arrondissement of Paris. The museum was created from the private home of Édouard André (1833–1894) and Nélie Jacquemart (1841–1912) to display the art they collected during their lives.

== History ==
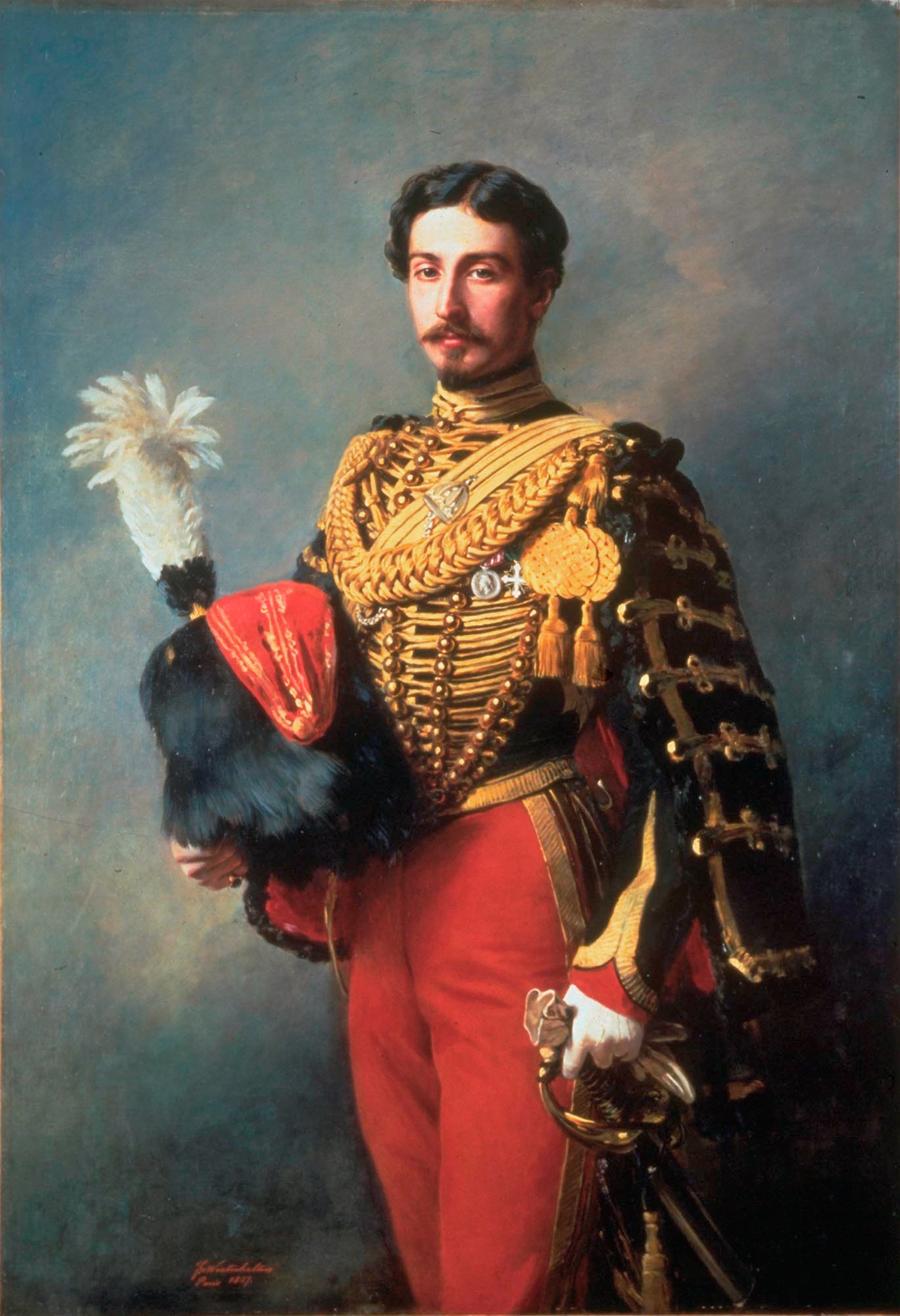
Portrait of Édouard André (1857), by Franz Xaver Winterhalter, Musée Jacquemart-André.

Édouard André, the scion of a Protestant banking family, devoted his considerable fortune to buying works of art. He then exhibited them in his new mansion built in 1869 by the architect Henri Parent, and completed in 1875.

He married a well-known society painter, Nélie Jacquemart, who had painted his portrait 10 years earlier. Every year, the couple would travel in Italy, amassing one of the finest collections of Italian art in France. When Edouard André died, Nélie Jacquemart completed the decoration of the Italian Museum and travelled in the Orient to add more precious works to the collection. Faithful to the plan agreed with her husband, she bequeathed the mansion and its collections to the Institut de France as a museum, and it opened to the public in 1913.

== Divisions ==
The museum is divided into five major parts:

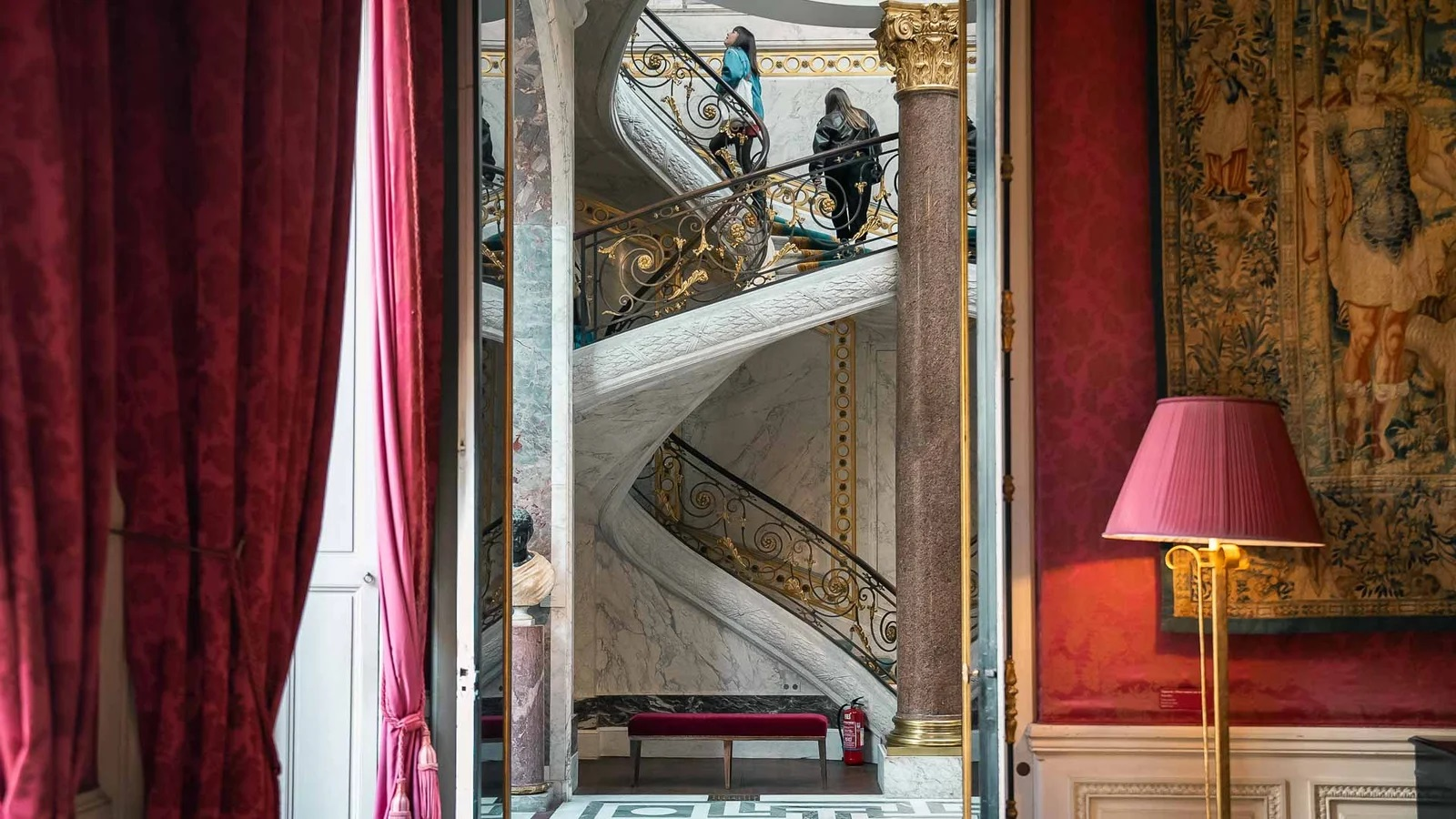
The grand staircase of the Musée Jacquemart-André in Paris, designed by architect Henri Parent.

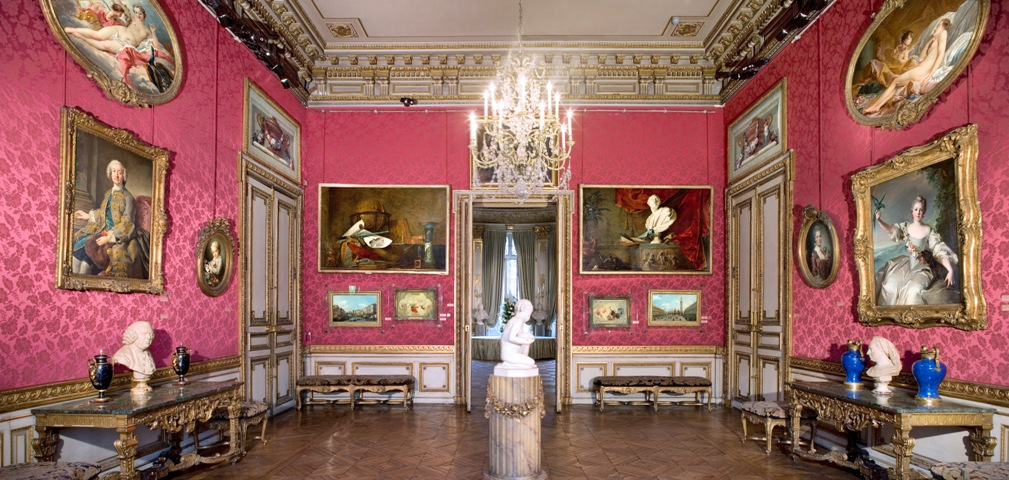
Musée Jacquemart-André

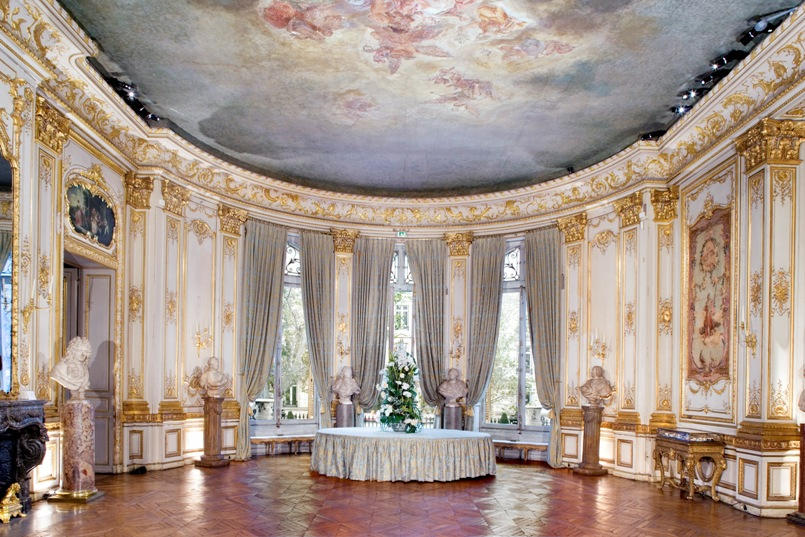
Musée Jacquemart-André

=== The State Apartments ===
the State Rooms were designed by the Andrés for their most formal receptions. They reflect their fascination for the French school of painting and 18th-century decorative art.

=== The informal Apartments ===
The Andrés would receive their business relations in a series of smaller, more informal salons. These were decorated in a refined style.

=== The winter garden ===
The Winter Garden was created by architect Henri Parent, who was seeking to surpass Charles Garnier, the builder of the then new Opéra Garnier.

=== The Italian museum ===
the Sculpture Gallery houses collections of 15th- and 16th-century Italian sculpture, with masterpieces by Francesco Laurana, Donatello, Luca Della Robbia and others. The Florentine Gallery is both a place of worship, containing works on religious themes — choir stalls, reredos and funerary monuments —; and a picture gallery focusing on the Florentine school, with works by Botticelli, Francesco Botticini and Perugino, and Ucello's celebrated St George and the Dragon. The Venetian Gallery attests to the Andrés' love of 15th-century Venetian artists. Dominated by a coffer ceiling attributed to Mocetto, paintings by Mantegna, Bellini or Carpaccio recreate the typical setting of a Venetian Palazzo.

=== The Private Apartments ===
The Andrés' private apartments occupy part of the mansion's ground floor.

== Collection ==
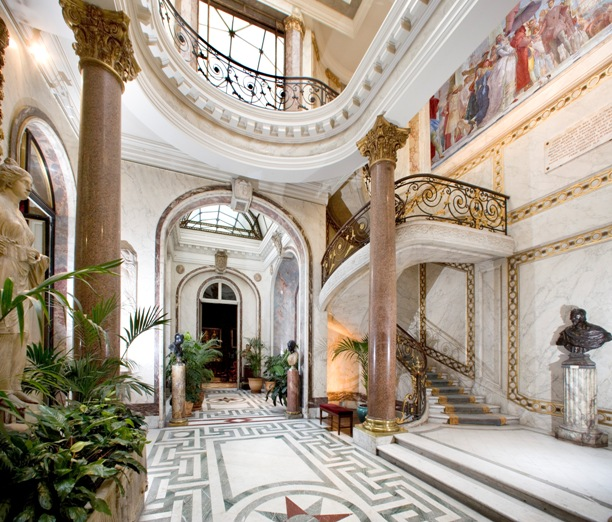
Musée Jacquemart-André

The museum features works by Élisabeth-Louise Vigée Le Brun, Bellini, Francesco Botticini, Luca Signorelli, Cima da Conegliano, Pietro Perugino, Neri di Bicci, Vittore Crivelli, Luca della Robbia, Paolo Uccello, Canaletto, Jean-Marc Nattier, Alfred Boucher, Quentin Massys, Rembrandt, Anthony van Dyck, Frans Hals, Giovanni Battista Tiepolo, Jacques-Louis David, Franz Xaver Winterhalter, Thomas Lawrence, Joshua Reynolds, Thomas Gainsborough, Gian Lorenzo Bernini, Sandro Botticelli, Andrea Mantegna, Jean-Honoré Fragonard, and Jean-Baptiste-Siméon Chardin.

== In popular culture ==
The forecourt and a salon were used during filming of the 1958 film Gigi. The final banquet of the 2002 film The Count of Monte Cristo by Kevin Reynolds was shot in a replica of the Grand Salon and the Honour Staircase of the Musée Jacquemart-André, but without the dividing wall in-between.

== See also ==
- List of museums in Paris
