= Bottici =

Bottici is an Italian surname.

== List of people with the surname ==
- Chiara Bottici (born 1975), Italian feminist philosopher and writer
- Laura Bottici (born 1972), Italian politician

== See also ==
- Botticini
