= Édouard André (art collector) =

French art collector (1833–1894)

Édouard François André
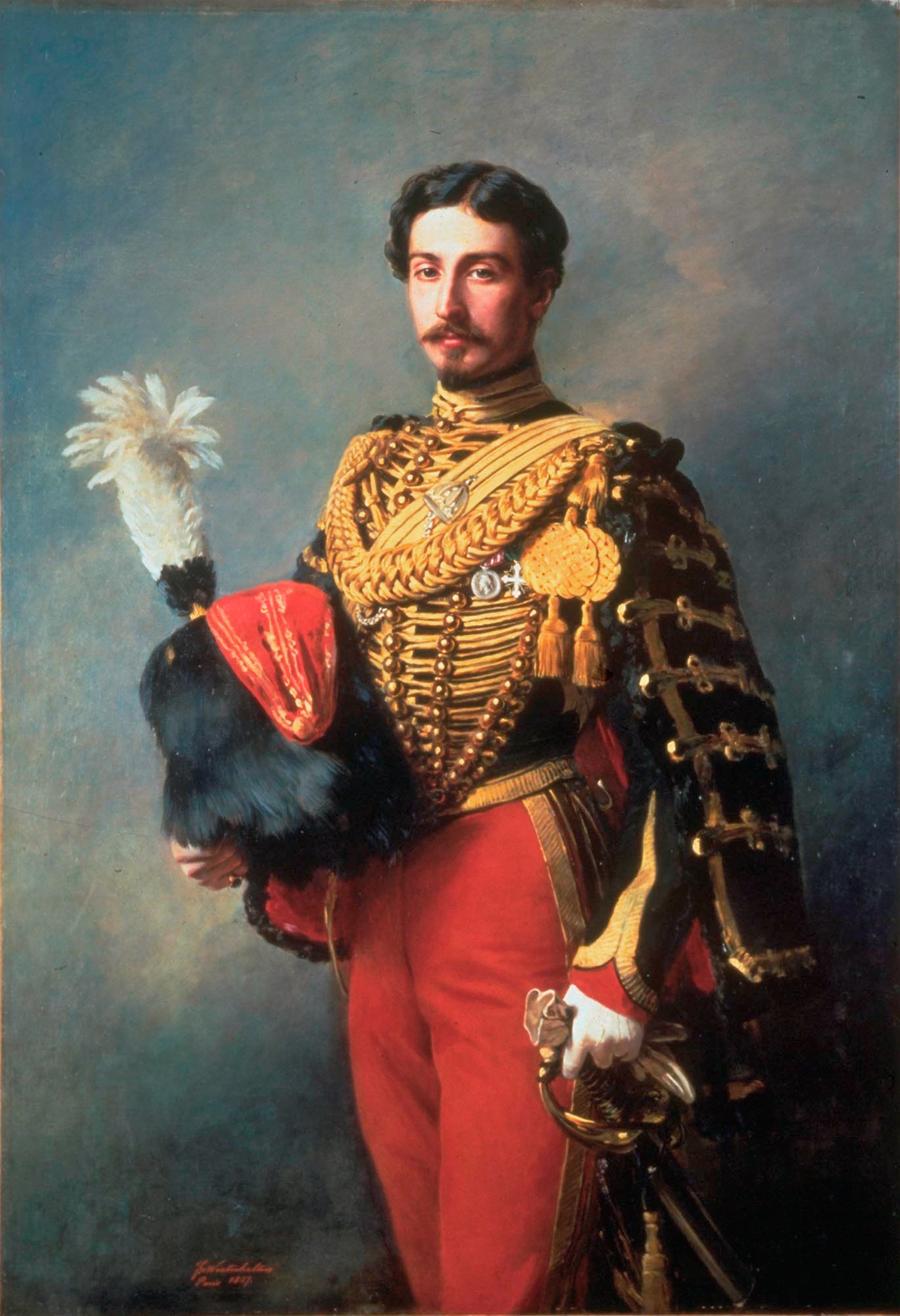
- Portrait of Édouard André, by Franz Xaver Winterhalter, Paris, Musée Jacquemart-André.
- Born: 13 December 1833
- Died: 16 July 1894 (aged 60)
- Occupations: Banker, politician, soldier and art collector
- Known for: Art collector, founder of Courtauld Institute
- Spouse: Nélie Jacquemart-André
- Parent: Ernest André

Édouard François André (French pronunciation: [edwaʁ ɑ̃dʁe]; 1833–1894) was a French banker, politician, soldier, and art collector. He was the husband of Nélie Jacquemart-André, the society painter. Their art collection is preserved at the Musée Jacquemart-André in Paris.

== Biography ==
Son of Ernest André (1803–1864), Edouard André was born into a family of rich banker Protestants, native to the southeast of France (Nîmes dans le Gard), who flourished during the Second French Empire. Edouard André lost his mother at the age of two.

In firm support of Napoleon III and sensitive to Saint-Simonian ideas, the Andre family was involved in financing the modernization of France and large companies of the imperial regime.

He succeeded his father as MP of Gard, and as such, he was elected on 29 May 1864. He was re-elected at the 1869 French legislative election; he served until 4 September 1870, when the Third Republic was established.

After the fall of the Second Empire, he joined the National Guard in 1871. With the Rothschilds, he negotiated the contribution that France had to pay to Germany after the surrender and brought the necessary amount together in a short time. Disappointed by politics, he decided to devote himself exclusively to his collections of paintings, furniture, and art objects. In 1868, he sought the architect Henri Parent to design a mansion of grand proportions on a plot of 5,700 m^{2} in Paris for 1.5 million francs.
