= Raffaello Botticini =

Italian painter

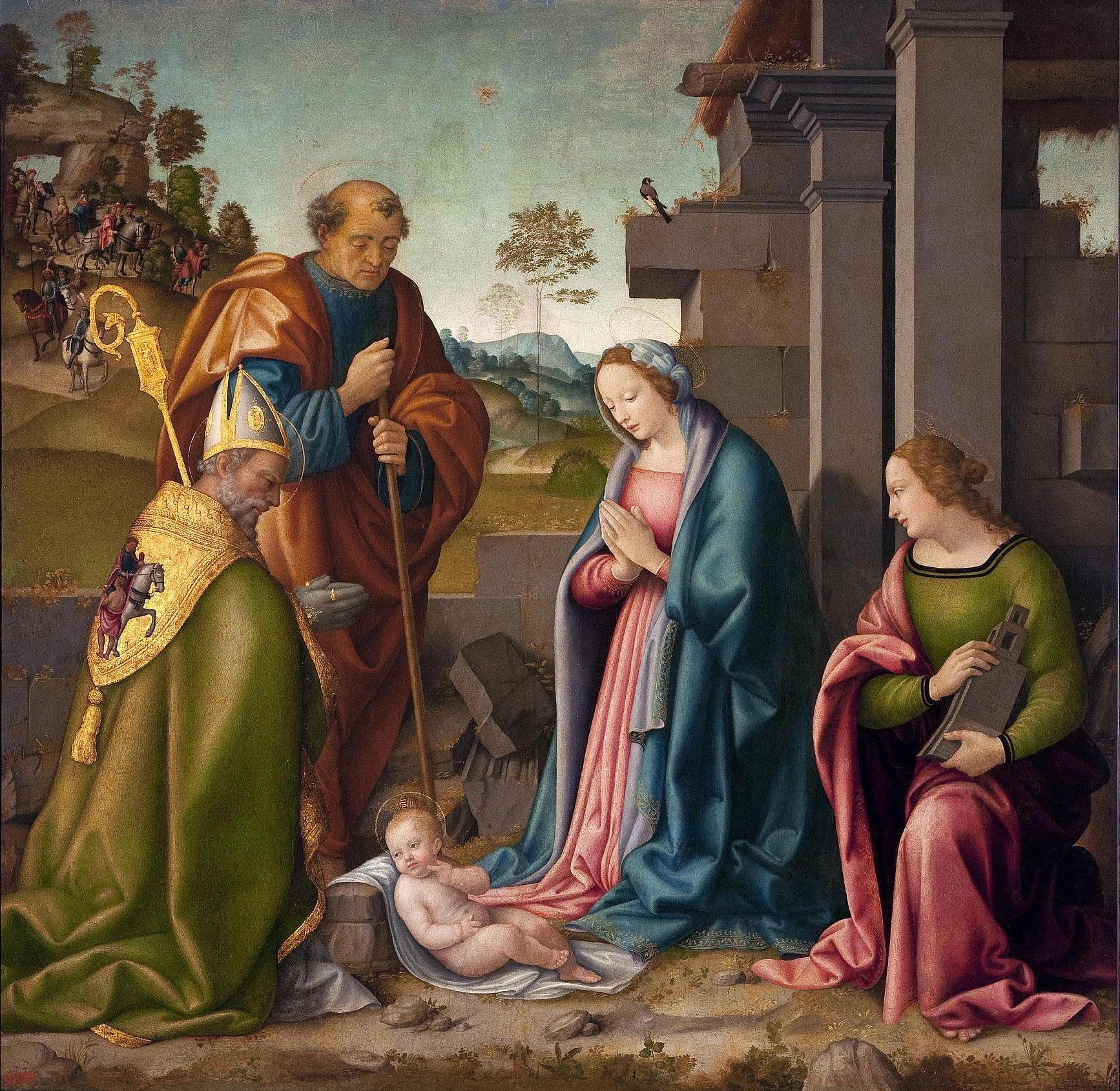
Nativity with Saints Martin and Barbara, 1512. Saint Petersburg, Hermitage Museum.

Raffaello Botticini (1474–after 1520) was an Italian Renaissance painter active in Florence and its environs.

Raffaello was trained by his father, the more famous Francesco Botticini, whose workshop he inherited. The Tabernacle of the Sacrament for the collegiate church of Sant'Andrea in Empoli, commissioned from Francesco in 1484 and delivered in 1491, was completed by Raffaello in 1504. This work is now in the church's adjoining museum. Raffaello painted other pictures for various churches in Empoli, including two panels of Saint Jerome and Saint Sebastian dated 1500 (now also at the collegiate museum) and an altarpiece of the Pietà (1508) for the chapel of the Compagnia della Veste Nera, destroyed in 1944. These panels show the strong influence of Raffaello's father as well as of Domenico Ghirlandaio and his pupils, Bastiano Mainardi and Francesco Granacci.

Other works by Raffaello Botticini include about a dozen paintings of the Virgin and Child. Some of his later altarpieces include the Nativity with Saints Martin and Barbara (1512) for the church of Santi Martino e Barbara in Castelfranco di Sotto (now Saint Petersburg, Hermitage Museum); the Annunciation with Saints Andrew and Francis (1513) for San Salvatore, Fucecchio (now in that town's Museo Civico); and the undated Madonna and Child with Saints Peter, Matthew, Justus and John the Baptist for the church of Santi Martino e Giusto in Lucardo, in the municipality of Montespertoli (in situ).

Raffaello died sometime after 1520.
