= Jules Worms =

French painter (1832–1924)

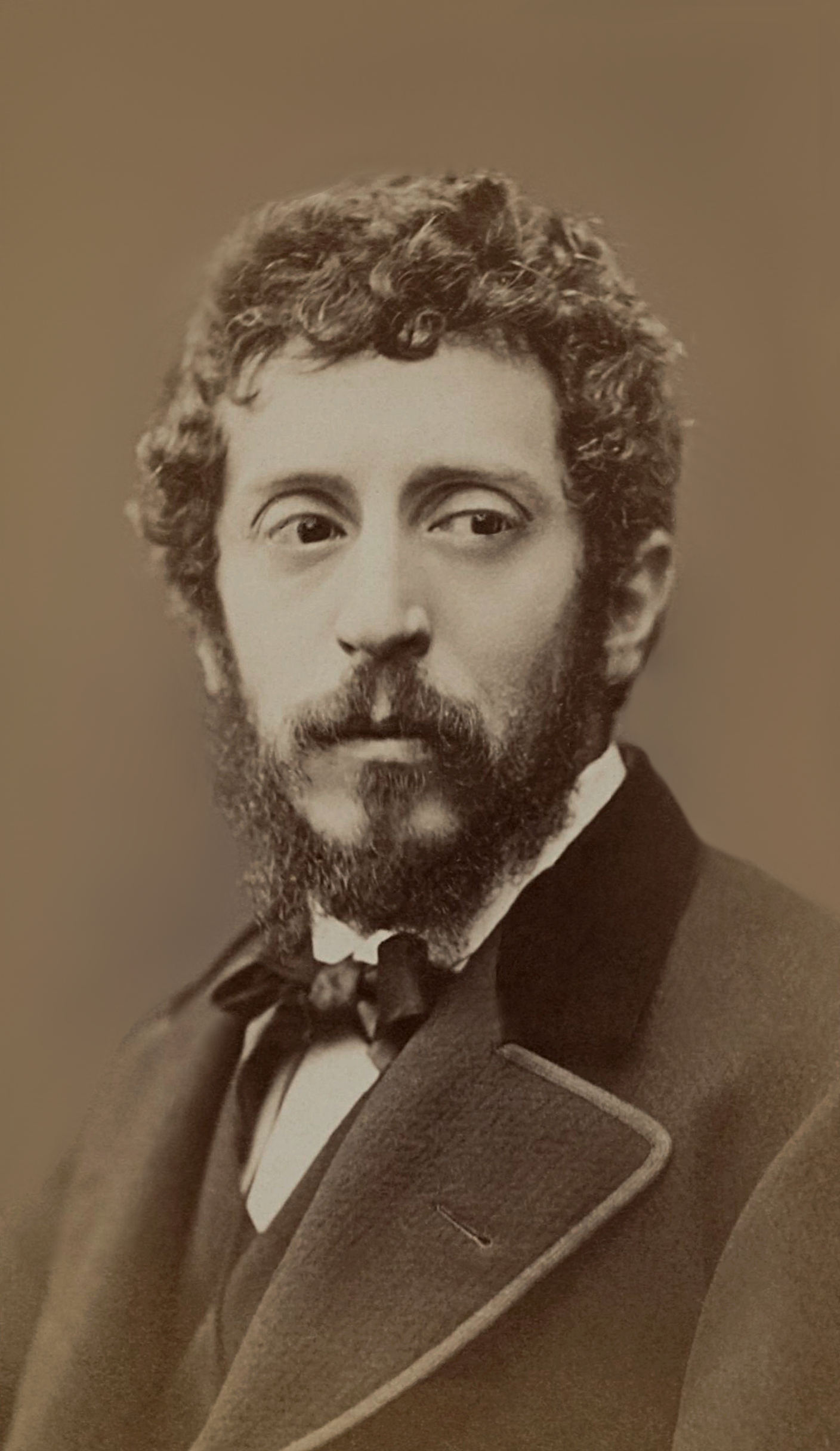
- Jules Worms, photograph by Ferdinand Mulnier c. 1878
- Born: 16 December 1832; Paris, France
- Died: 25 November 1924 (aged 91); Paris, France
- Education: École des Beaux-Arts, Paris
- Known for: Painting, Illustrations
- Awards: Chevalier de la Légion d'honneur

Jules Worms (16 December 1832 – 25 November 1924) was a French academic painter and illustrator. Born into a family of Parisian shopkeepers, he entered the École des Beaux-Arts in 1849 at the age of seventeen, where he studied under Jean-Adolphe Lafosse (1810–79). He made his debut at the Paris Salon of 1859. Worms is best known for genre scenes depicting Spanish life, often comical and painted in a highly realistic manner with many details and bright colors.

== Career ==
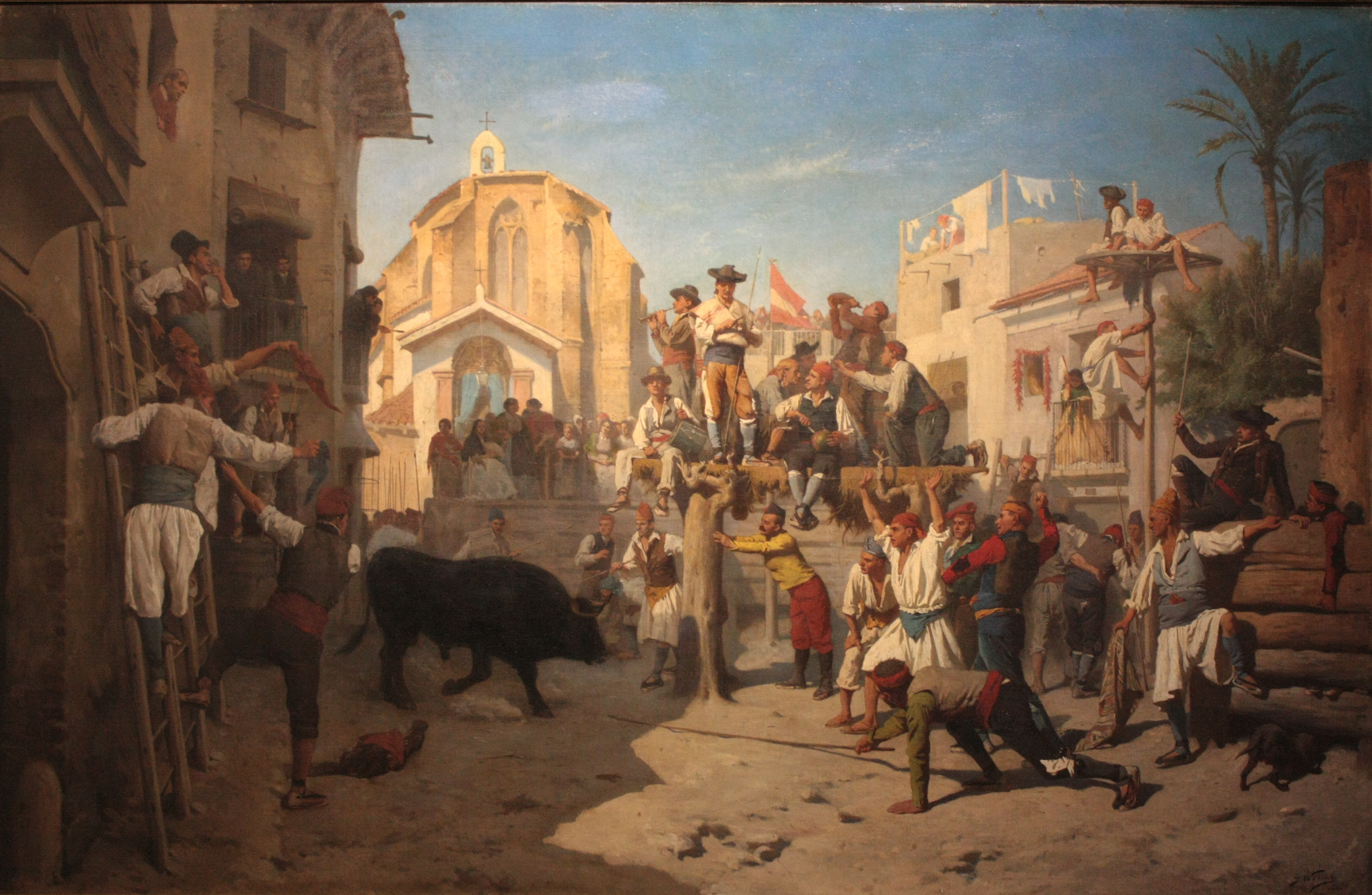
Novillada dans la province de Valence, 1866, Musée des beaux-arts de Pau.

In the early 1860s, Worms made his first trip to Spain, where he was immediately enchanted with Spanish culture and customs. Worms returned for six extended trips between 1860–61 and 1882, traveling widely and gathering sketches and costumes for studio paintings back in Paris. In 1871 he spent six months in Granada with the Catalan painter Marià Fortuny, whom he had met in Paris.

His painting La romance à la mode, exhibited at the Salon of 1868, was purchased by the French State. It is now in the collection of the Musée d'Orsay and is displayed at the Luxembourg Palace in Paris.

Worms also created illustrations for books, including Les Contes rémois by Louis de Chevigné, the Fables of La Fontaine in 1873, Don Quixote in 1884, Aladdin, and One Thousand and One Nights.

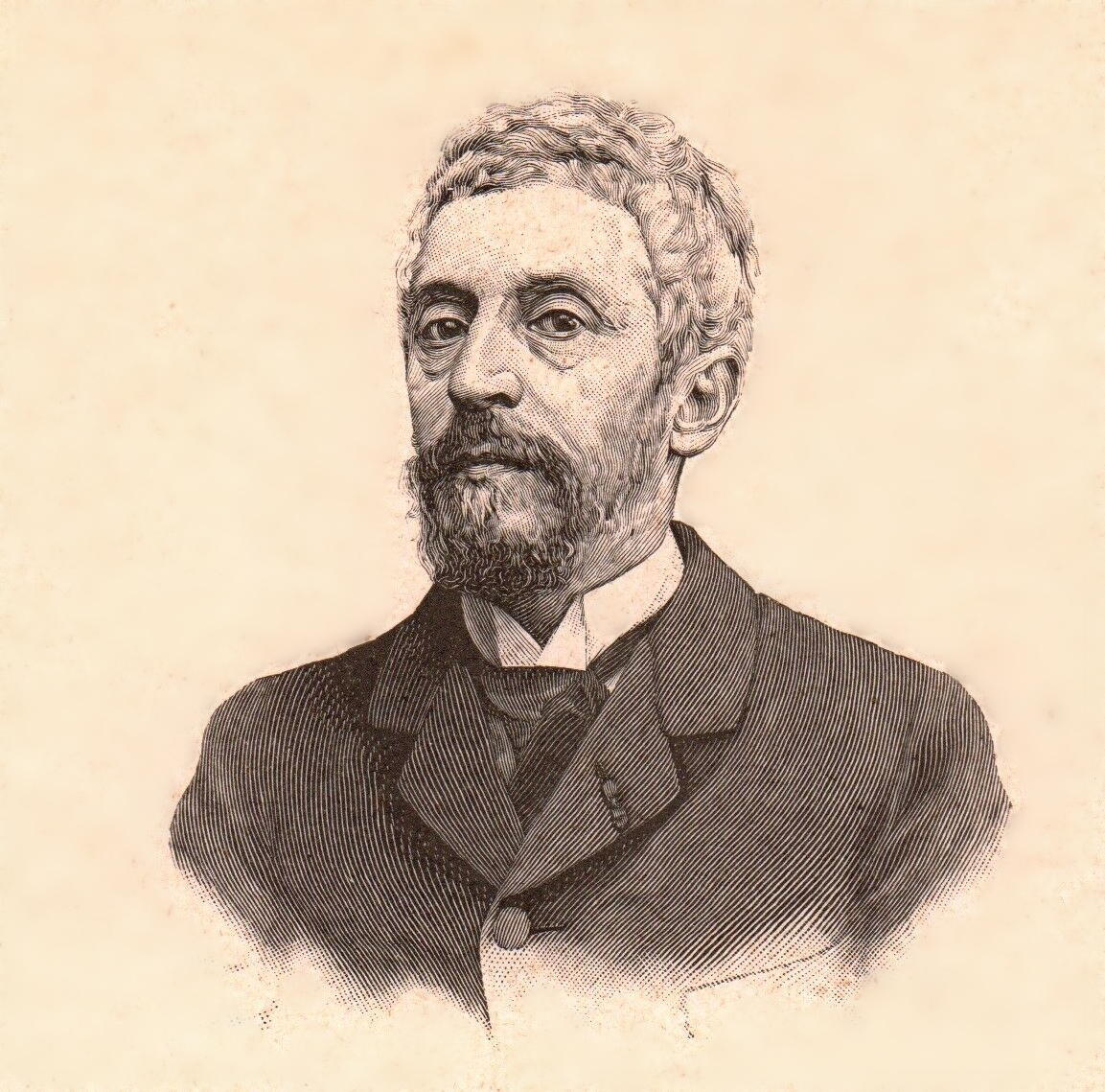
Portrait of Jules Worms from Album Mariani v. 7 (1902).

Worms continued to exhibit his paintings at the annual Paris Salon until the 1890s. His illustrated memoirs of travels in Spain, Souvenirs d’Espagne, impressions de voyages et croquis, was published in 1906. He continued to paint at least up until World War I, and his paintings continued to sell consistently in both France and the United States. Jules Worms died in Paris at the age of 91 on 25 November 1924.

Worms was made a Knight of the Legion of Honour in 1876. He became a member of the Society of French Artists in 1883.

== Works in museums ==
In the United States, his work is held in the permanent collections of the Haggin Museum and the Clark Art Institute; in France, of the Musée d'Orsay, the Musée des Beaux-Arts de Dijon, the Musée Magnin in Dijon, the Musée des Beaux-Arts de Rennes, the Musée des Beaux-Arts de Nancy, and the Musée des Beaux-Arts de Pau; in Spain, of the Museo Bellver in Seville; in Austria, of the Dorotheum in Vienna. A work by Worms in the Nob Hill mansion of Leland Stanford was destroyed in the San Francisco earthquake and fire of 1906.

== Gallery ==
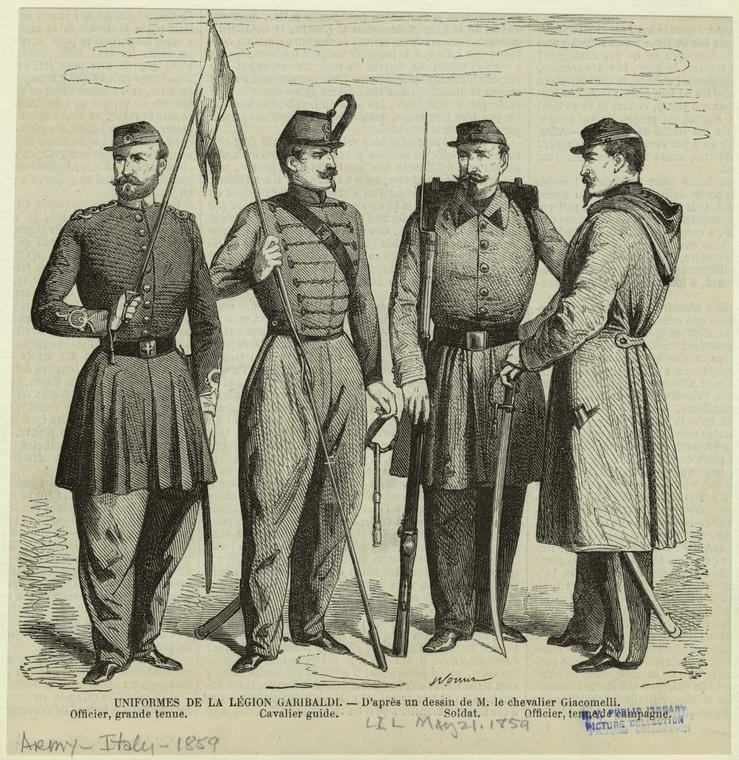
Uniformes de la légion Garibaldi, engraving by Jules Worms after Hector Giacomelli, 1859

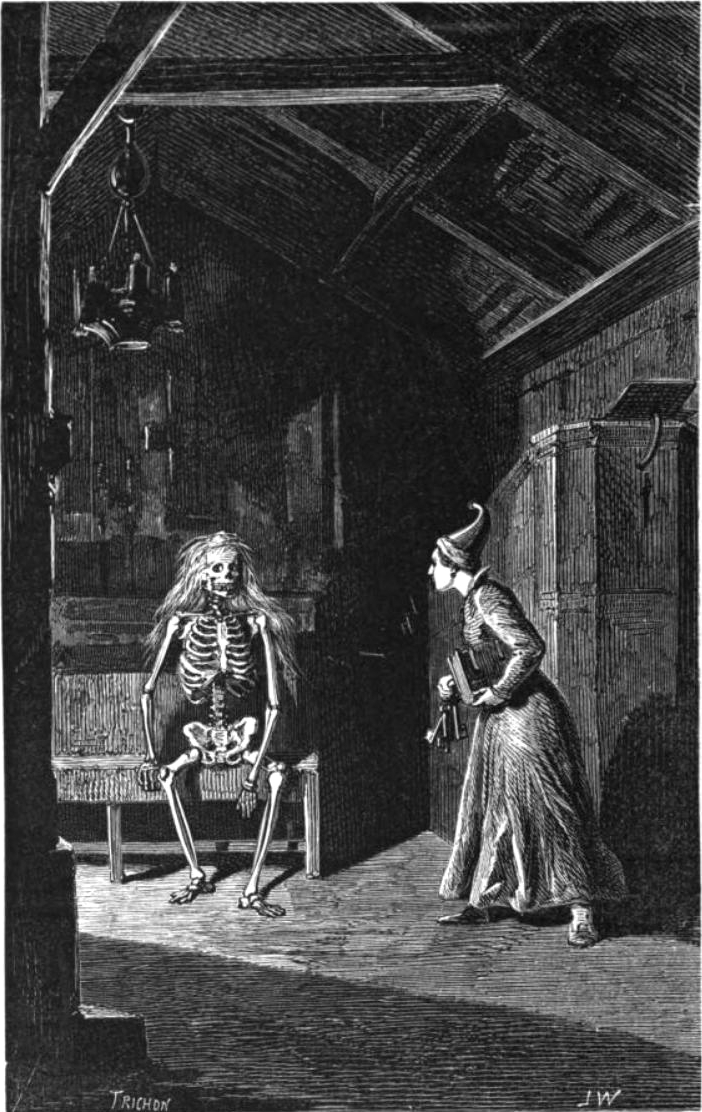
Illustration for Icelandic Legends by Jón Árnason, 1864

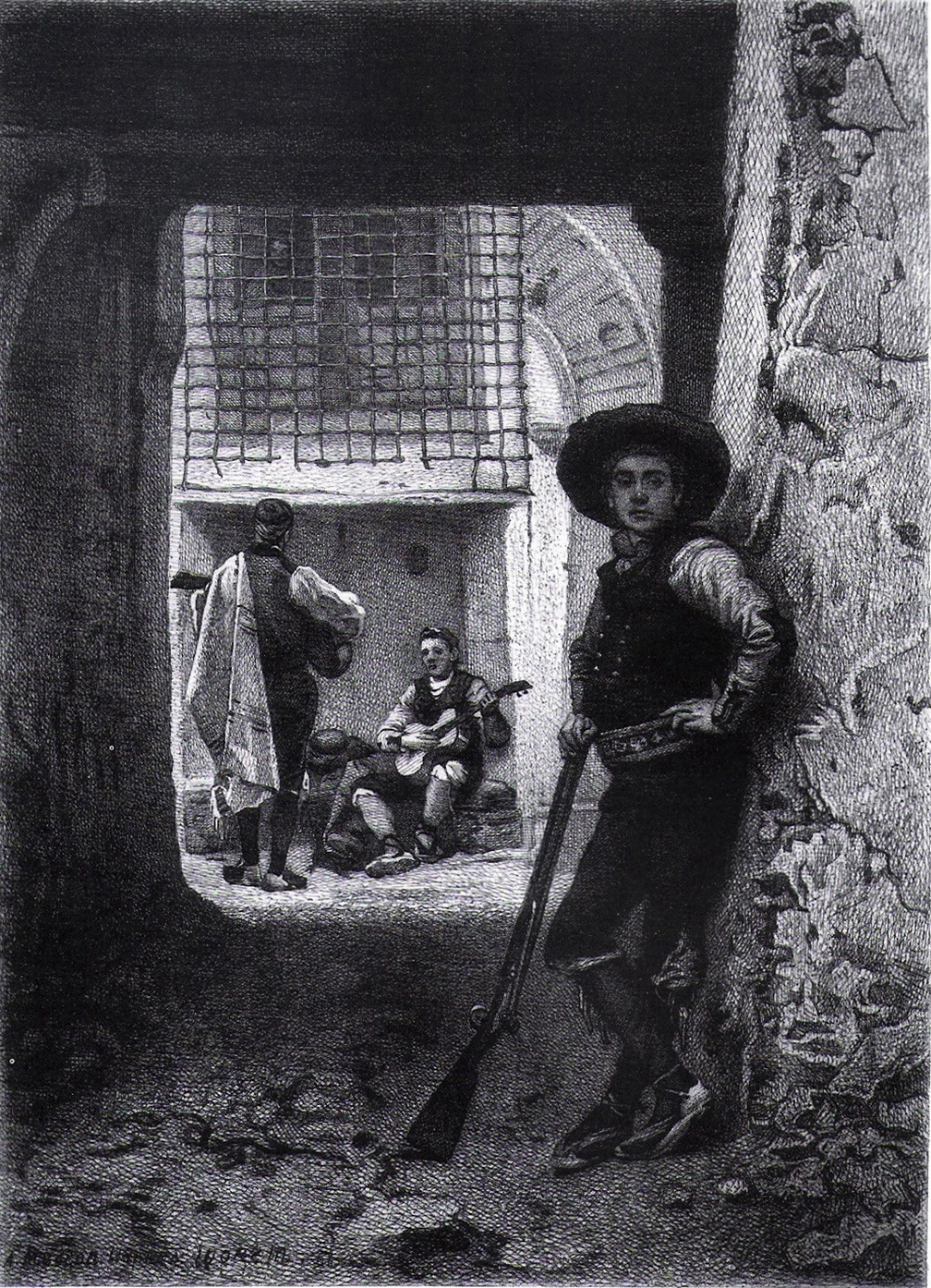
La Ronda, 1876

Departure for the Review, c. 1876, Clark Art Institute

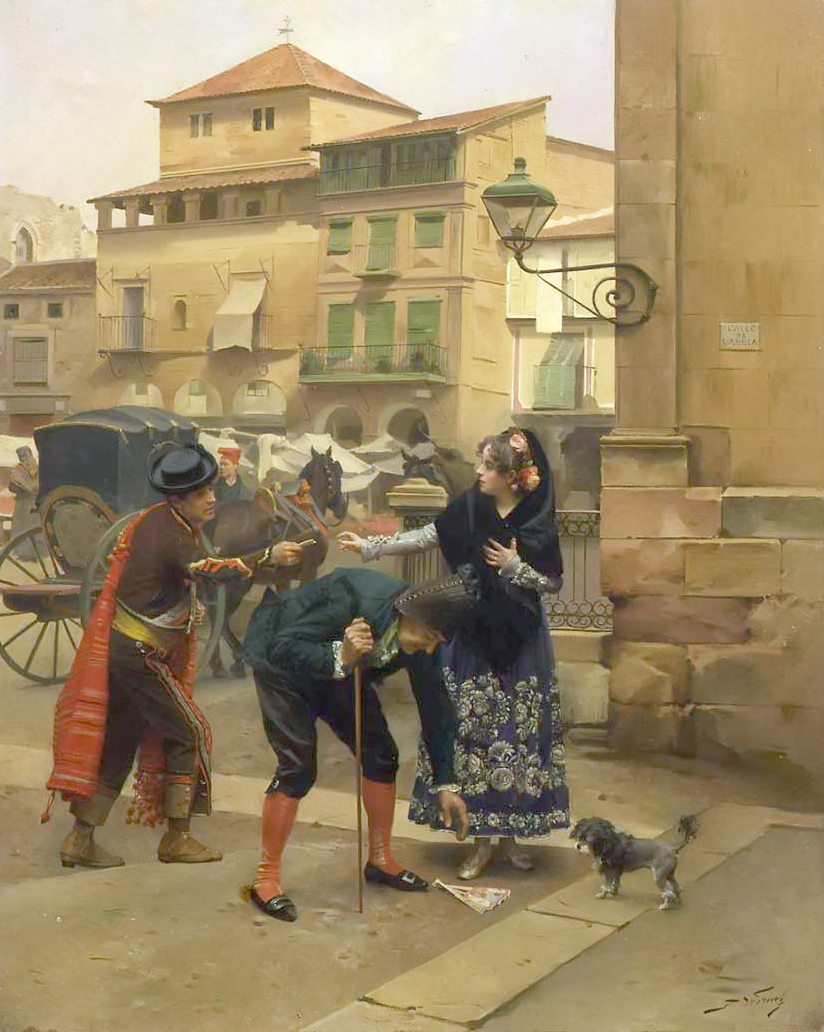
The Furtive Message, after 1877, Haggin Museum

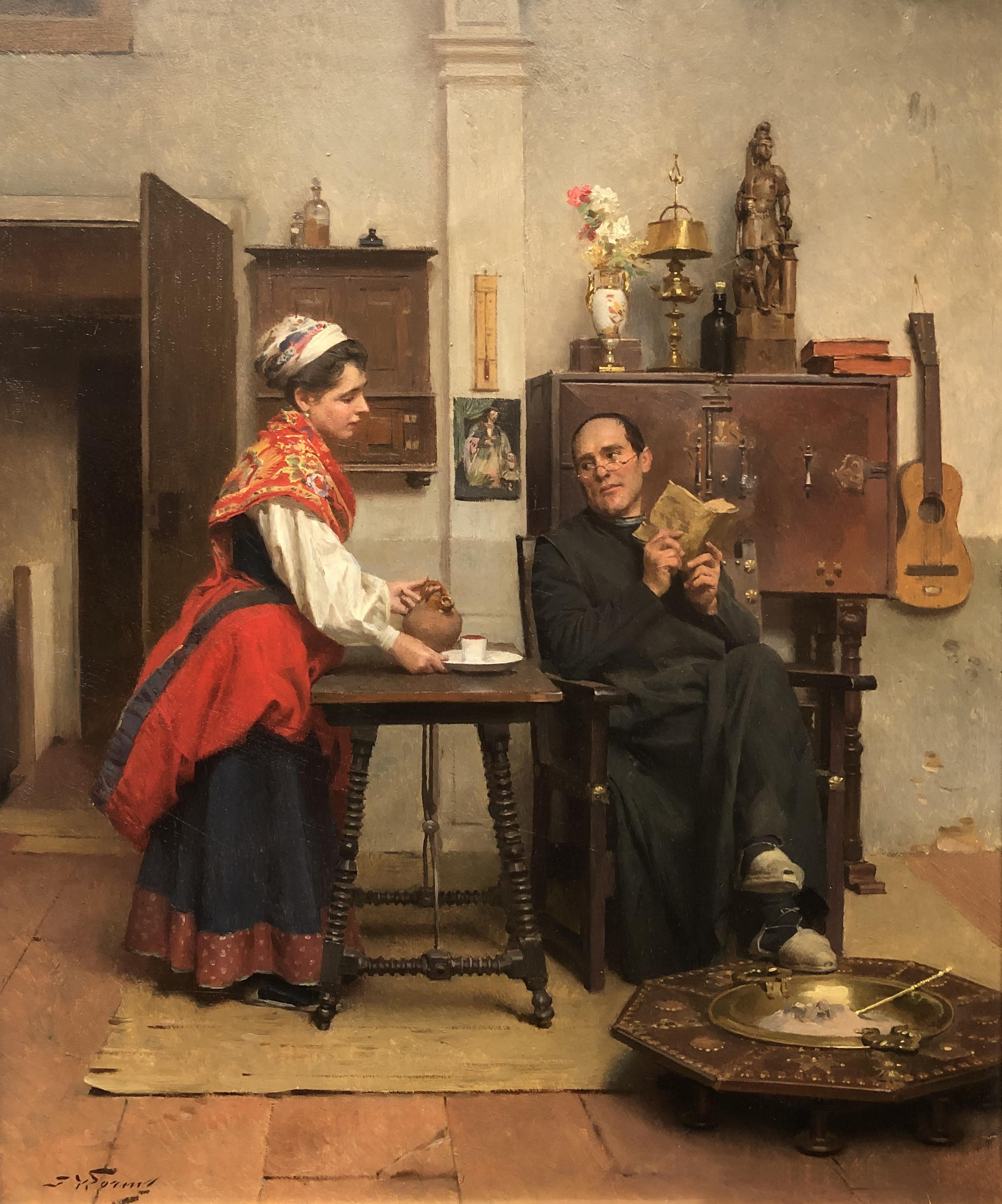
The Red Shawl, undated, Haggin Museum

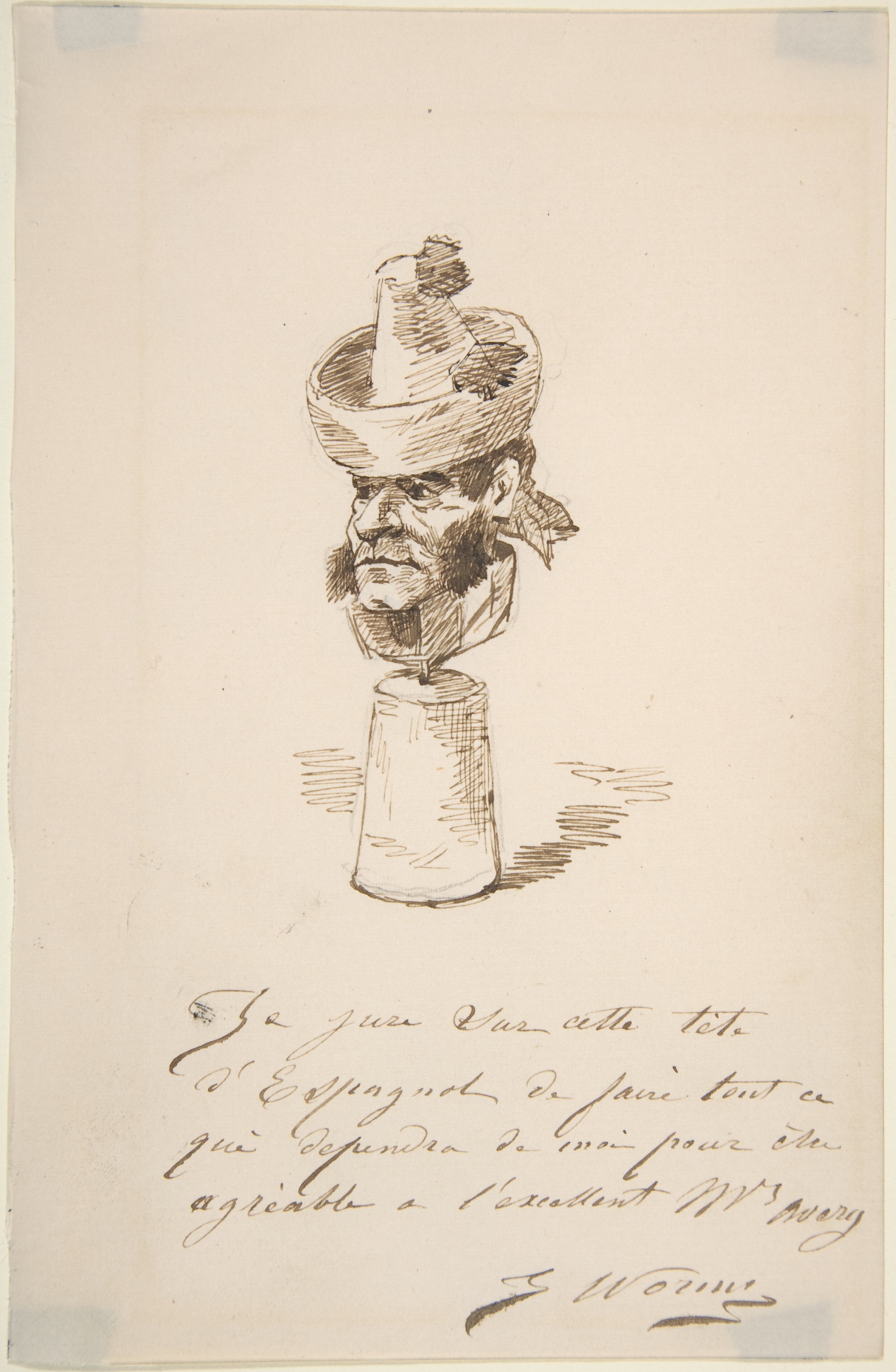
Caricatured Head of a Spaniard, 1880, Haggin Museum

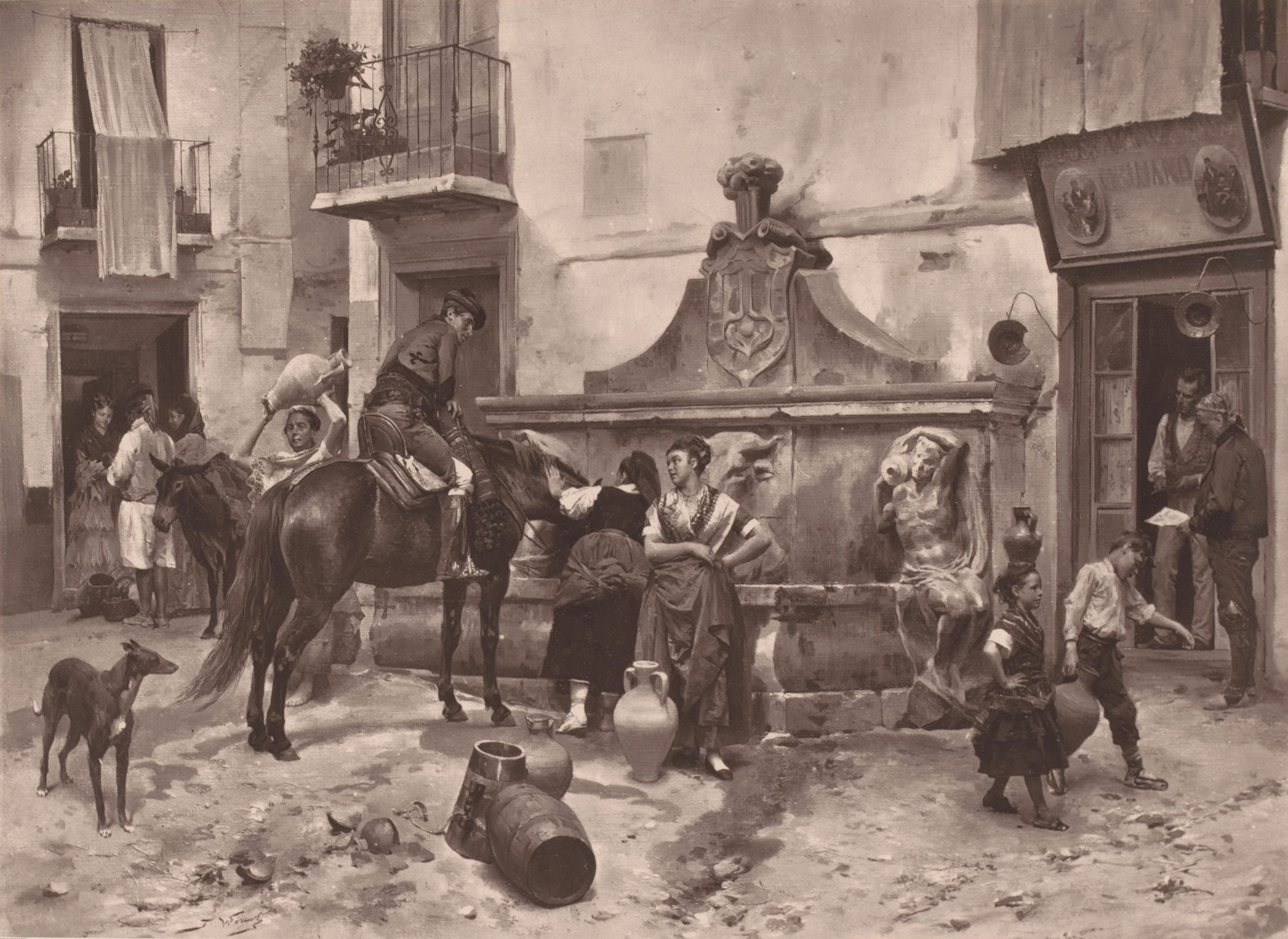
La Fontaine du Taureau a Granada, c. 1873–1878, photogravure Goupil

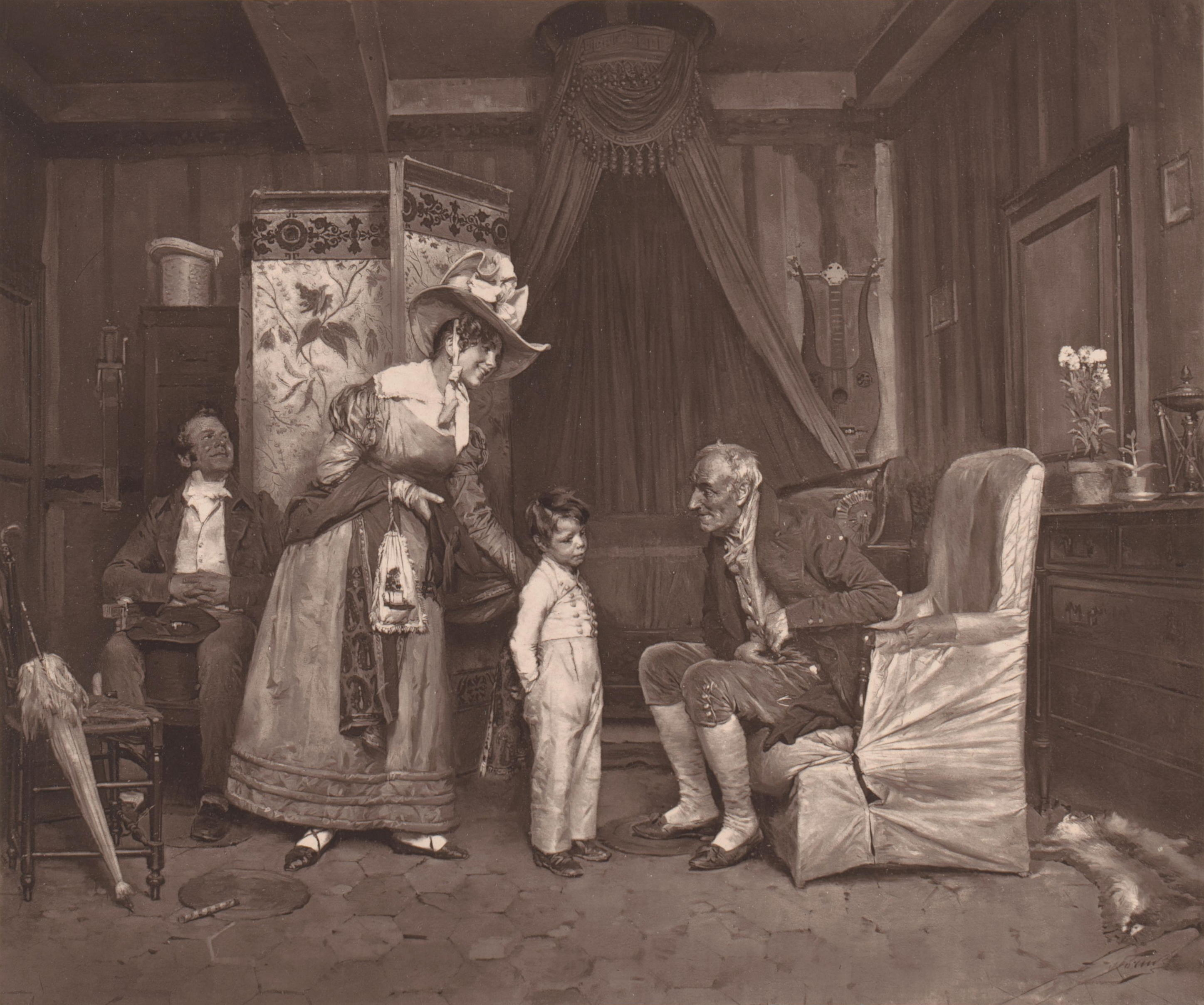
Le Compliment, c. 1873–1878, photogravure Goupil

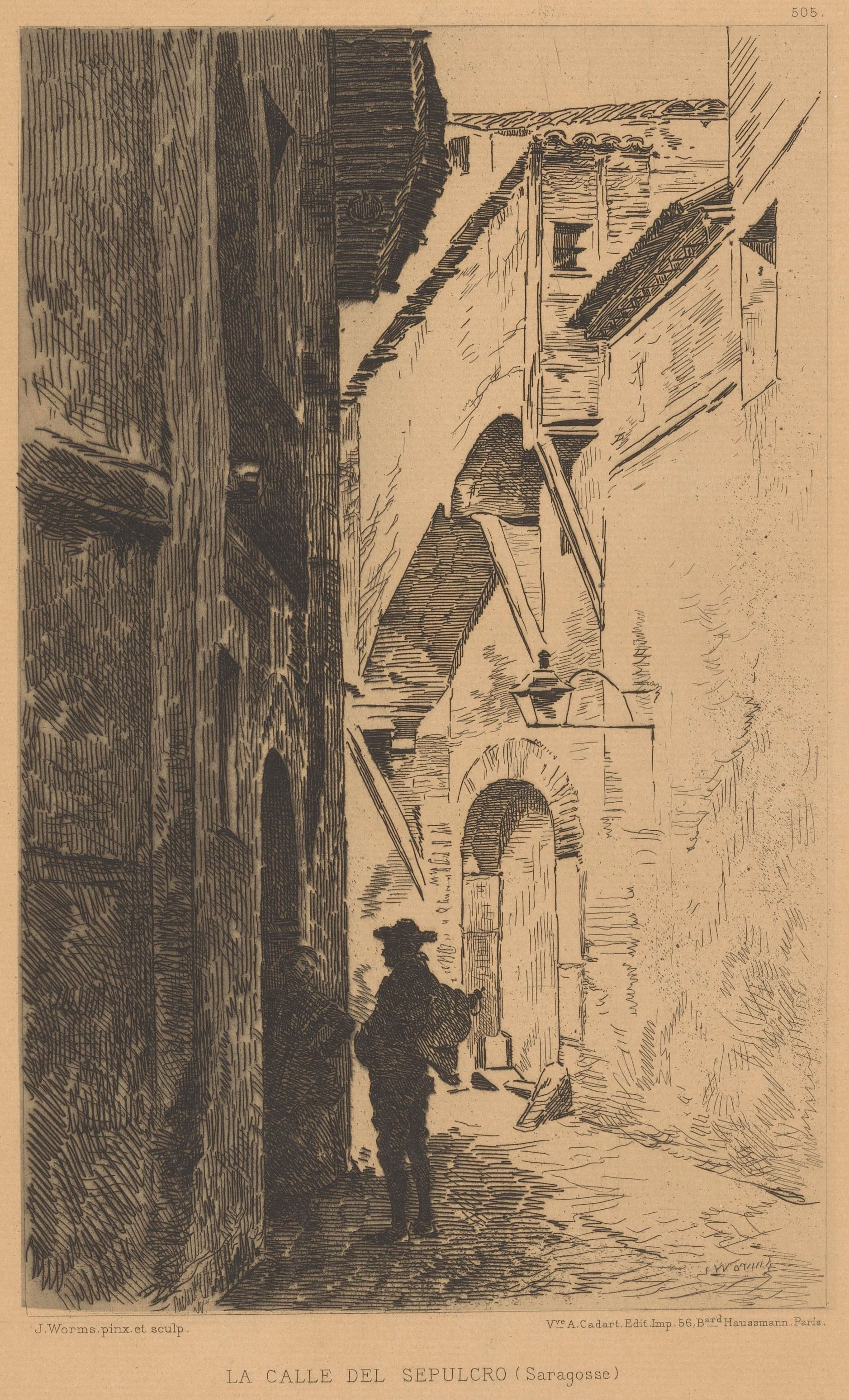
La Calle del Sepulcro (Saragosse), 1875-1882

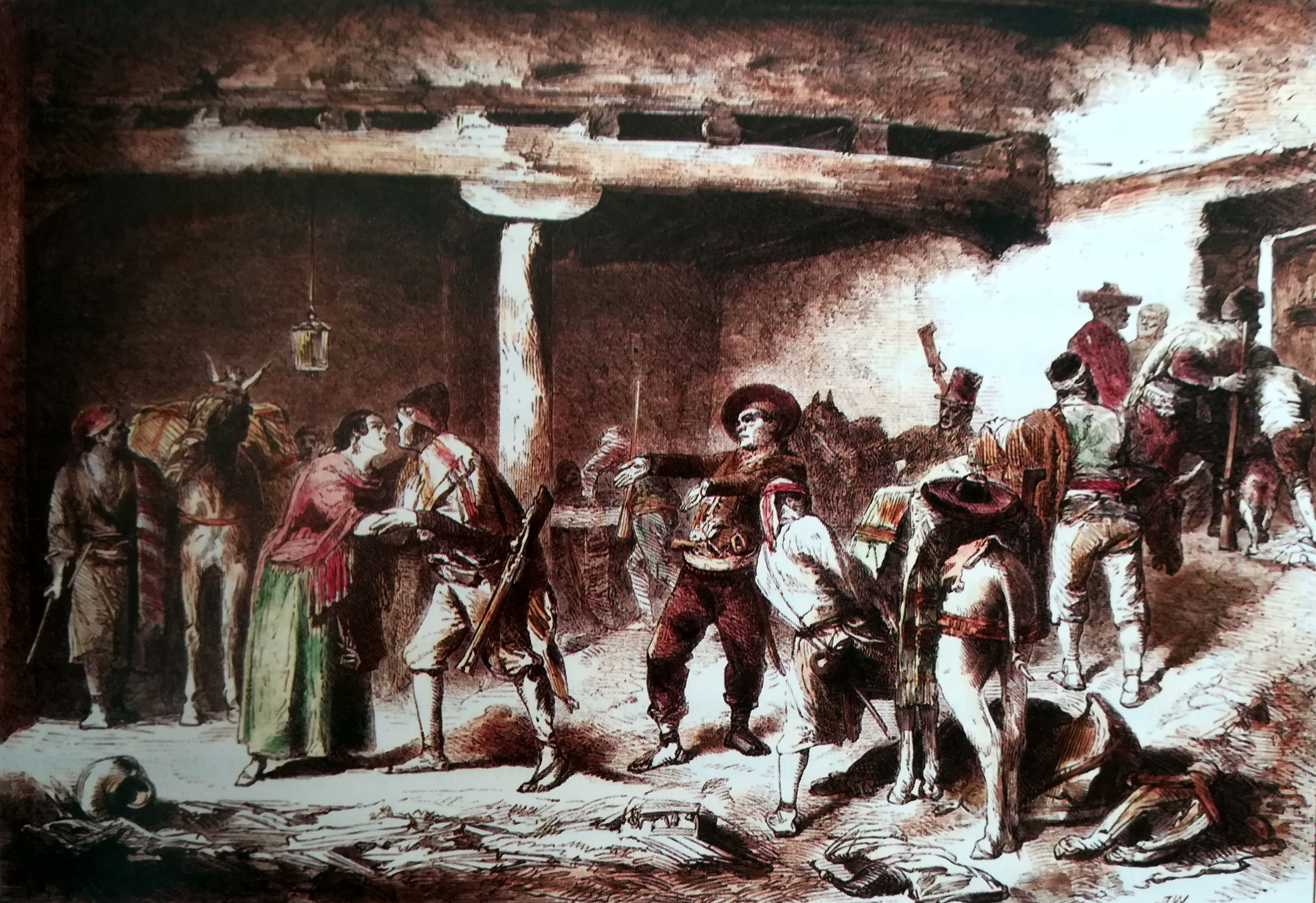
Departure of the Smugglers, 1882

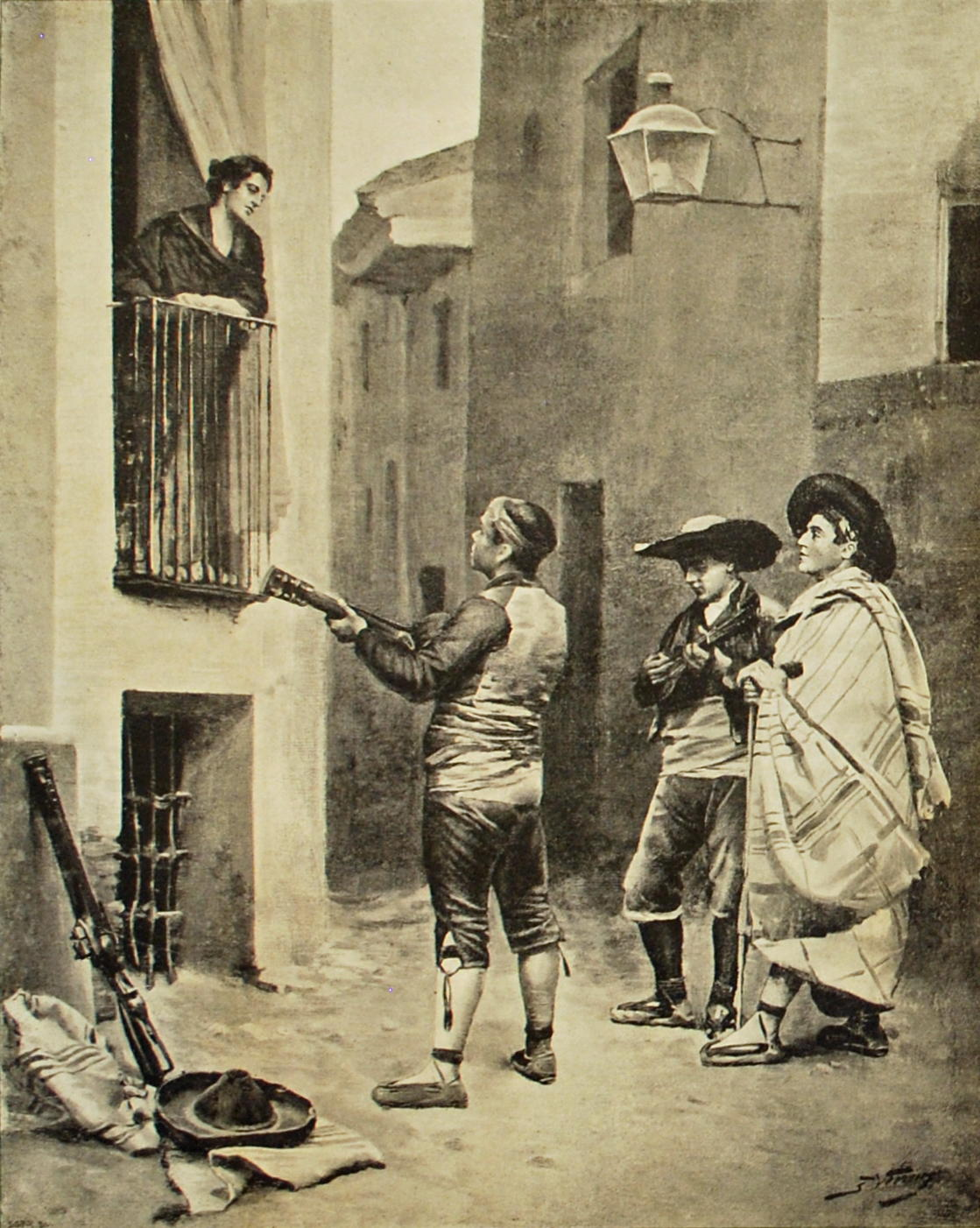
Serenade, c. 1888

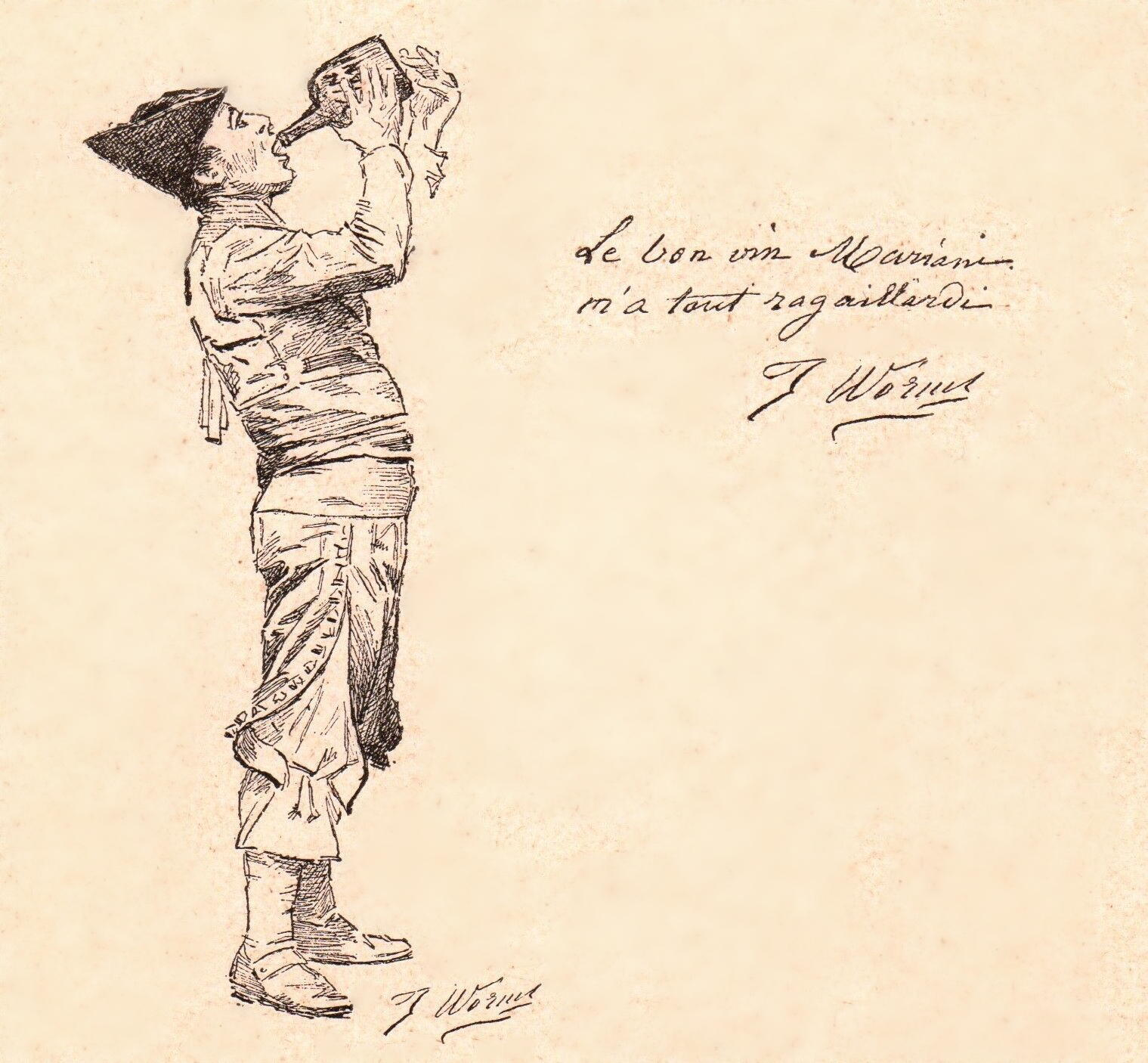
Drawing (testimonial to vin Mariani) from Album Mariani v. 7, 1902

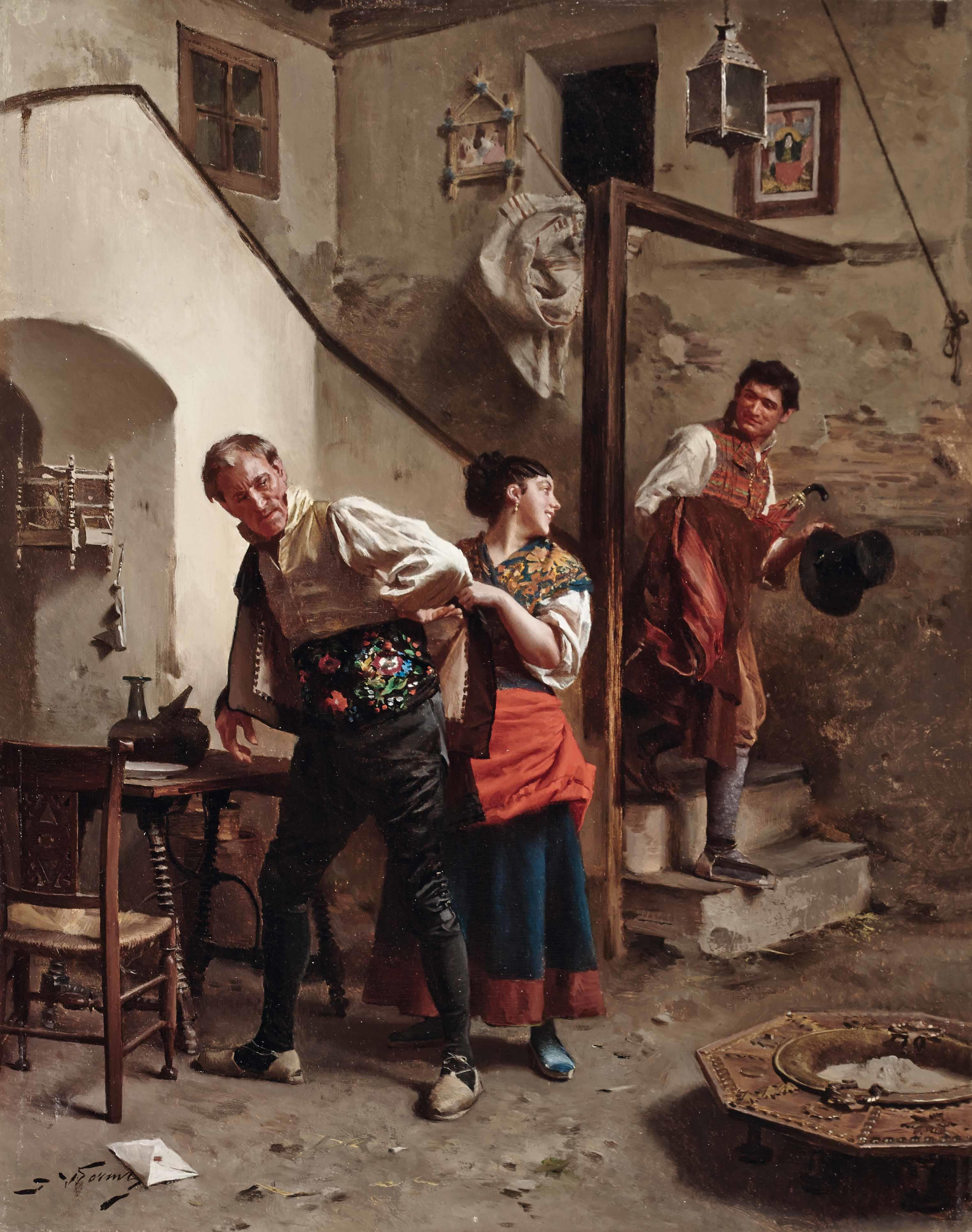
Sortie du maître, by 1914, Dorotheum, Vienna

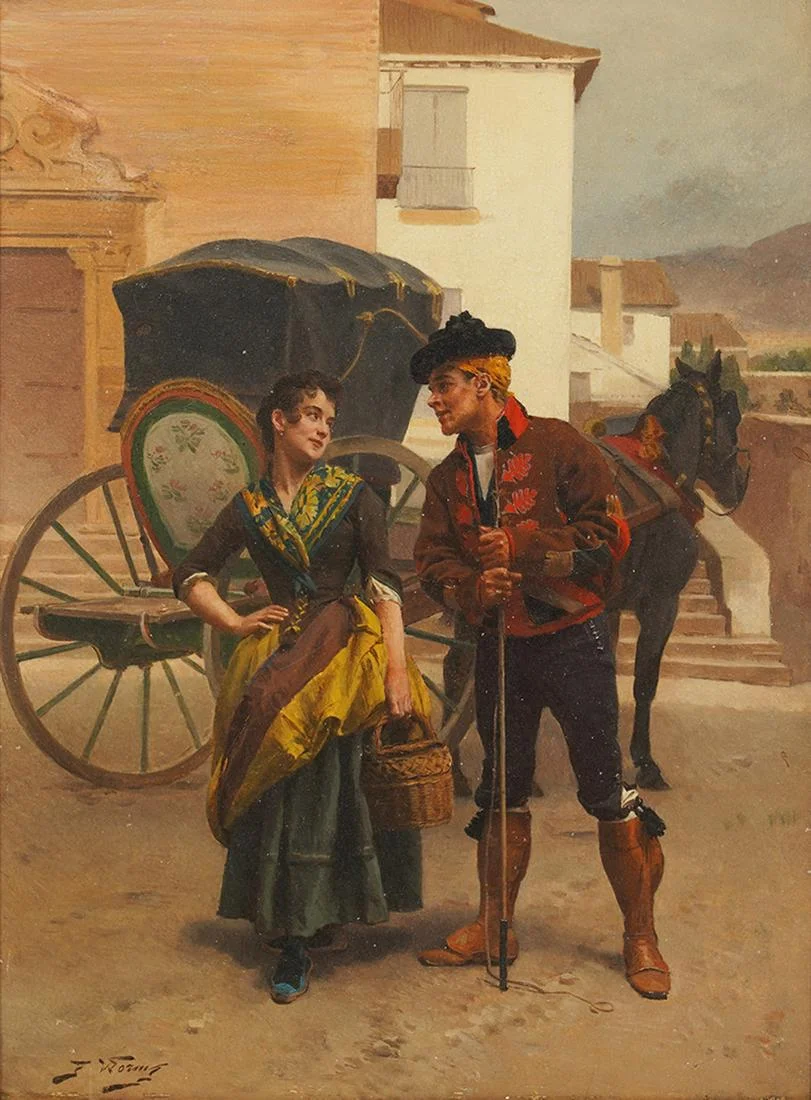
Chance Meeting, undated, private collection

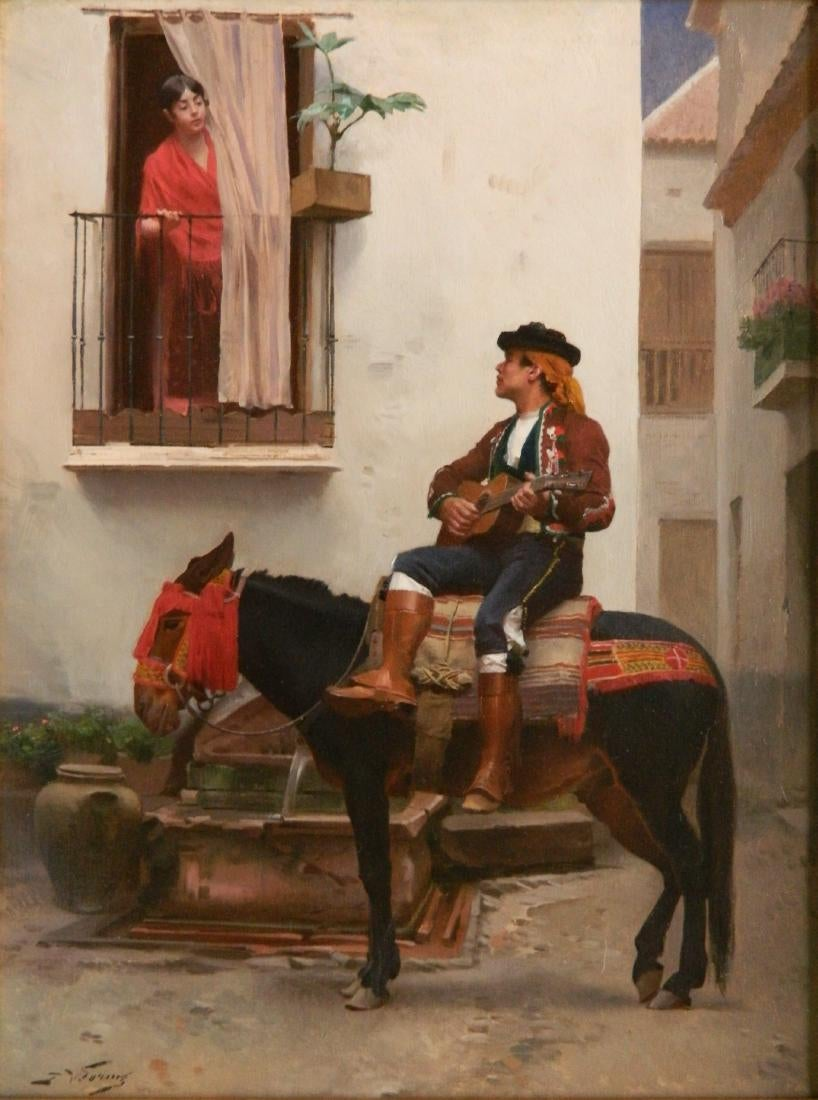
Untitled, undated, private collection

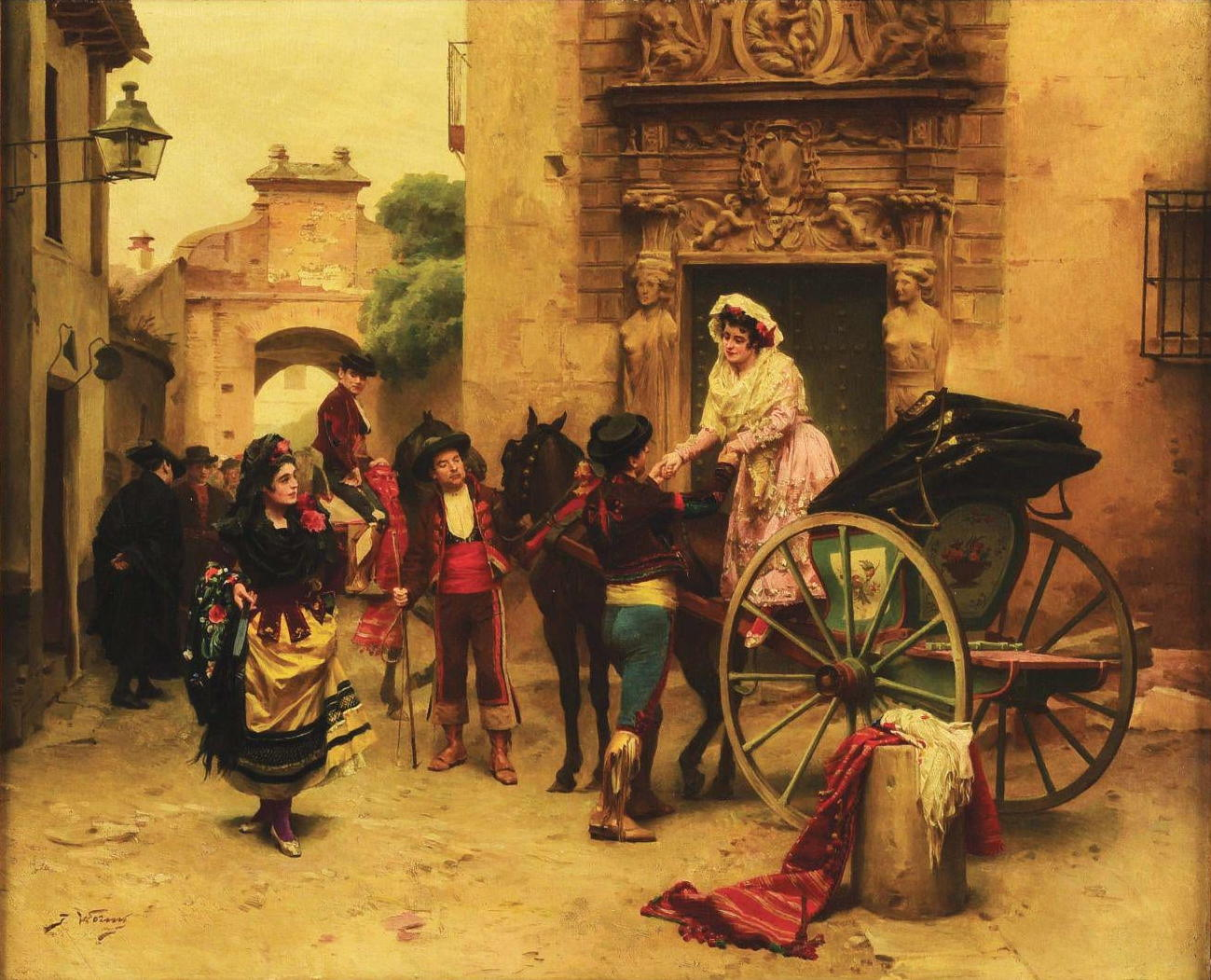
Untitled, undated, private collection

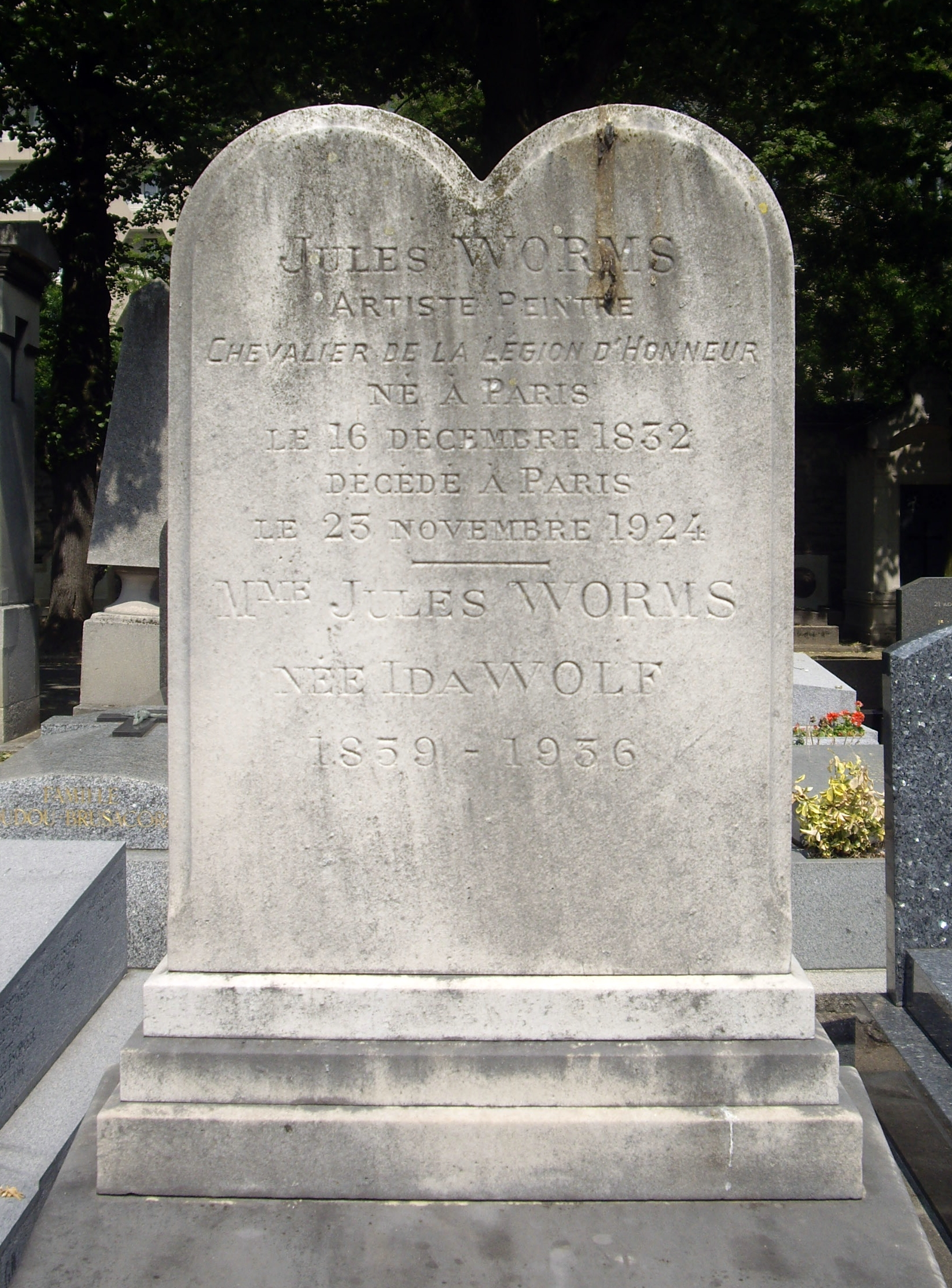
Tombstone of Jules Worms, Montparnasse Cemetery, Paris

== Publications ==
- Souvenirs d'Espagne - impressions de voyages et croquis (Memories of Spain - impressions from trips and sketches), illustrated book with 53 engravings and 8 plates after the drawings and paintings by the author, Paris: H. Floury, 1906.
