= Francesco Botticini =

Italian painter (1446–1498)

Francesco Botticini (real name Francesco di Giovanni, 1446 – 16 January 1498) was an Italian painter of the Early Renaissance. He was born in Florence, where he remained active until his death in 1498. Although there are only few documented works by Botticini, a considerable corpus has been confidently attributed to him on the basis of style including a number of altarpieces, dozens of small-scale religious panels and a few portraits.

== Life ==
=== Early work ===
Botticini was born in Florence in 1446. His father was Giovanni di Domenico di Piero, a naibaio, or painter of playing cards, from whom he probably received his initial artistic training. By 22 July 1459 was a salaried assistant in the workshop of Neri di Bicci. Botticini left Neri's workshop in 24 July 1460. He eventually came into contact with Andrea del Verrocchio, in whose workshop he would have met Leonardo da Vinci, Lorenzo di Credi, Domenico Ghirlandaio, and Pietro Perugino. Although Botticini's presence in Verrocchio's studio is not documented, it is often inferred on the basis of style. Botticini opened his own workshop by 1469, as reported in an arbitration document from that year. He remained close with his father, who oversaw his working contracts until 1475, when he filed for emancipation. The emancipation was granted in 1477, according to legal records.

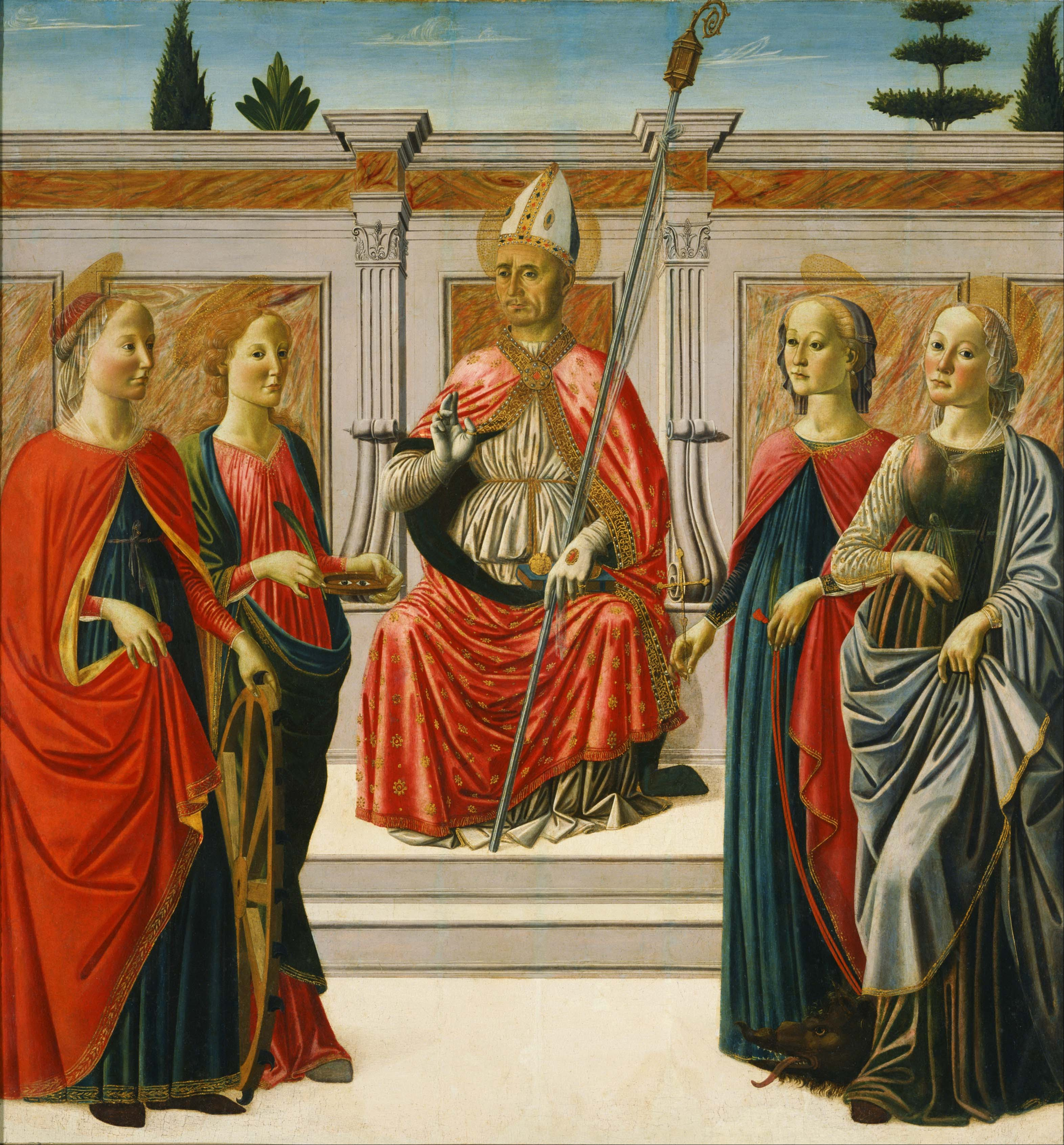
Saint Nicolas Enthroned between Saints Catherine, Lucy, Margaret and Apollonia, circa 1465. Tokyo, National Museum of Western Art.

Botticini's earliest works include the Saint Nicholas and Four Female Saints at the National Museum of Western Art, Tokyo, a Saint Sebastian at the Metropolitan Museum of Art, New York, and a Madonna adoring the Child at the Birmingham Museum of Art in Alabama. His earliest dated work is an altarpiece of the Madonna and Child with Saints Sebastian, Pancras, Sebastian and Peter (1471) at the Musée Jacquemart-André, Paris, which is painted under the strong influence of Verrocchio. The Saint Monica Enthroned with Augustinian Nuns in Santo Spirito, Florence, is usually dated to this year, as is the famous Three Archangels with the Young Tobias at the Uffizi. (Note: Otherwise dated to 1470.)

=== Maturity ===
By 1475 Botticini had developed a more personal style, which he first expressed in his most famous work, the large Assumption of the Virgin at the National Gallery, London. Wrongly attributed Botticelli in Giorgio Vasari's Lives of the Artists, this painting has been unanimously attributed to Botticini since the early twentieth century. The attribution is corroborated by extant documents, which state how the painting was begun in 1475 and completed in 1477. The picture was commissioned by the poet Matteo Palmieri and his wife Niccolosa, presumably for their burial chapel in the now-destroyed church of San Pier Maggiore, Florence. However, some scholars believe it was instead intended for Palmieri's chapel in the Badia Fiesolana (outside Florence) because the dimensions are almost the same as Hans Memling's Last Judgment, a work initially intended for the Badia but later stolen and taken to Gdansk, Poland. Several preparatory drawings for Botticini's altarpiece survive in various collections.

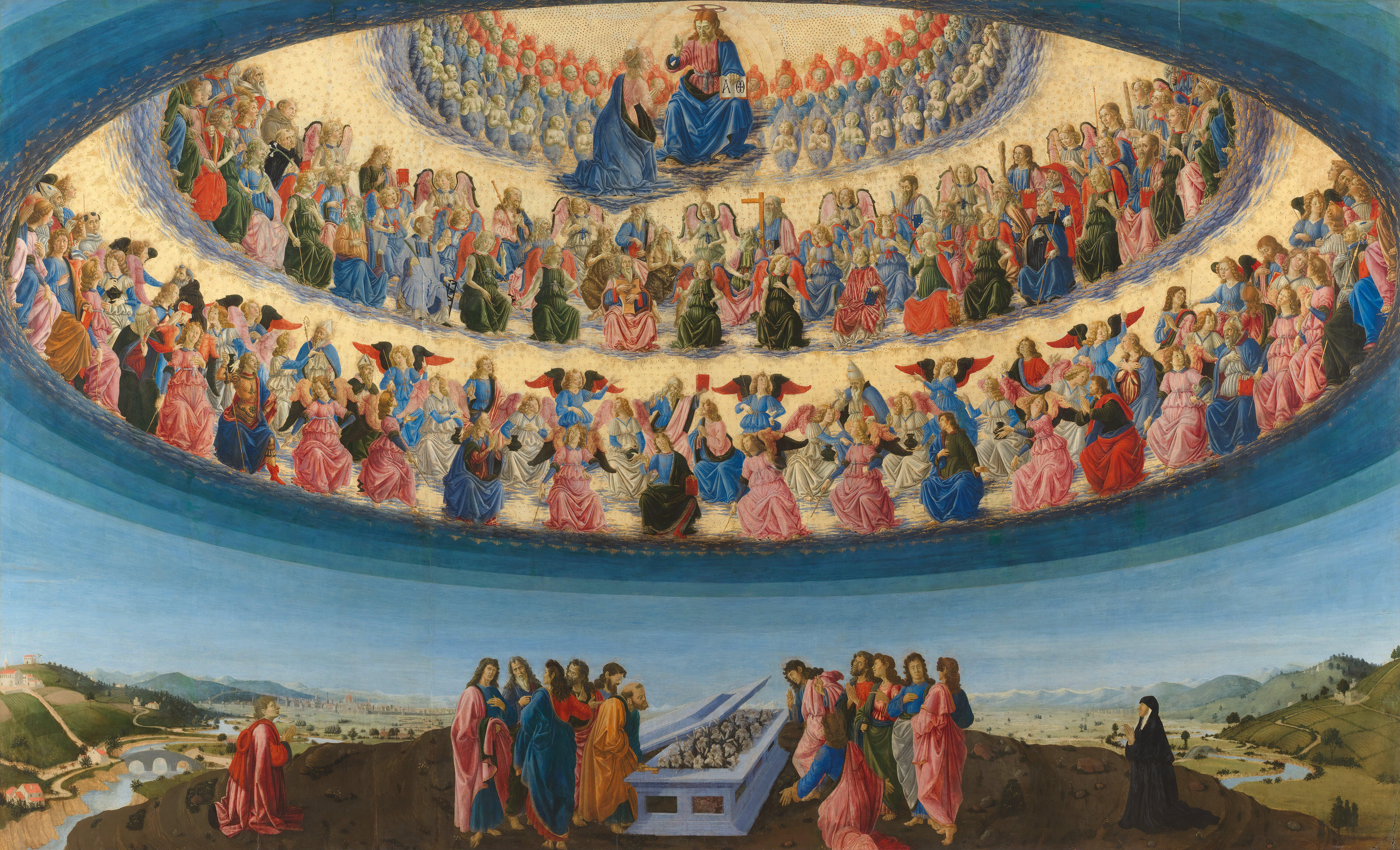
Assumption of the Virgin, 1475–77. London, National Gallery.

The altarpiece's unusual composition and subject was surely dictated by its patrons, who appear in the lower corners of the composition. The background includes a view of Florence and the Arno valley. Some of Palmieri's properties on the hills of Fiesole, such as the farm included in his wife's dowry, are clearly discernible. The interpretation of Mary's bodily assumption into heaven, with the Virgin welcomed by rings of angels and saints, is based on the last stanza of Palmeri's poem, the Città di Vita (1465). The poem describes a controversial Lucretian idea that the soul began in heaven and descended to earth, without being crafted by God. Vasari wrote that Botticini's Assumption, like Palmieri's poem, was considered heretical and thus covered soon after its completion. This claim is likely fictitious but the donors' faces have indeed been scratched out, clearly indicating the controversies that surrounded Palmieri's ideas.

In the 1480s Botticini was consistently employed in Florence as well as nearby Empoli. For Empoli's collegiata church of Sant'Andrew he created two large tabernacles, one dedicated to Saint Sebastian and the other the Holy Sacrament. Both tabernacles are today in the adjoining museum. The larger of the two, the Tabernacle of the Sacrament, was commissioned in 1486 and was largely complete by 1491, when it was installed on the church's high altar. In 1504, however, Botticini's son Raffaello was called in to add the finishing touches. Several preparatory drawings survive for the draperies of the saints in the side panels.

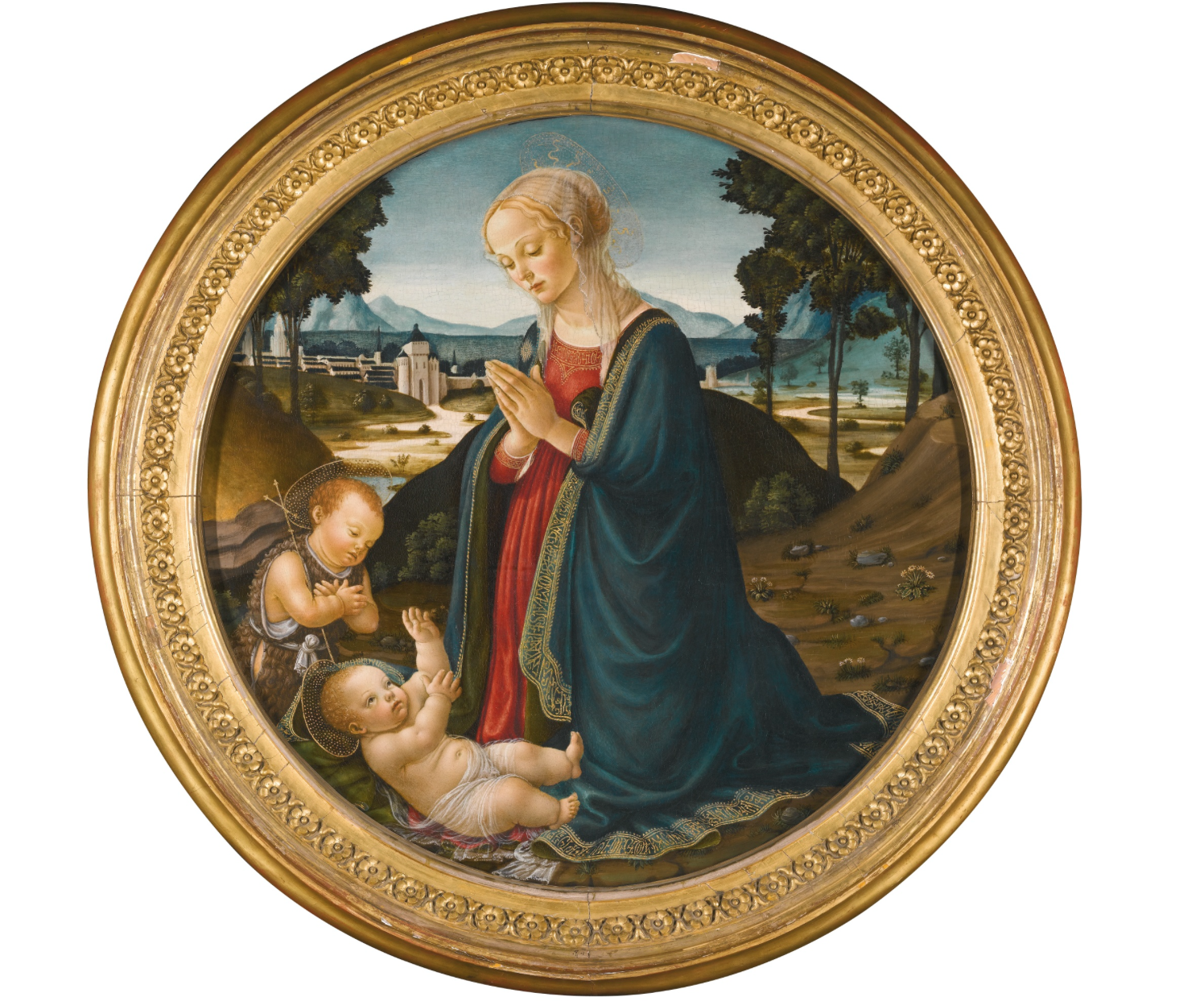
Madonna adoring the Child with Saint John the Baptist, 1480s. Sold at Sotheby's, London, in 2013.

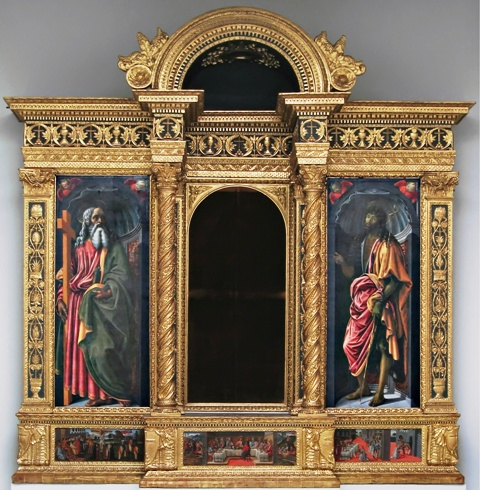
Tabernacle of the Sacrament, 1486–91. Empoli, Museo della Collegiata.

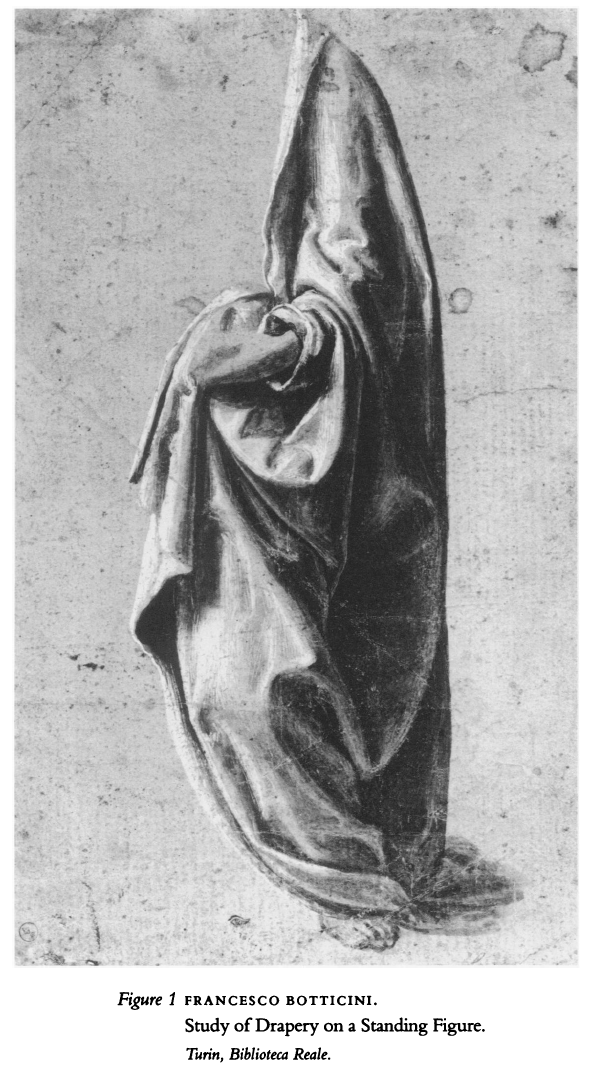
Drapery Study for Saint Andrew in the Tabernacle of the Sacrament, circa 1486-91. Turin, Biblioteca Reale.

In 1488 Botticini painted an altarpiece of the Pietà with Four Saints for the meeting room of the Confraternity of San Domenico del Giglio at the basilica of Santa Maria Novella, Florence, now at the Musée Jacquemart-André, Paris.

Throughout his career, Botticini painted numerous panels with religious subjects for the homes of Florentine citizens. He was especially popular as a painter of tondi, or circular pictures, invariably of the Virgin and the young Saint John the Baptist, patron saint of Florence, kneeling in adoration of the Christ Child. One such example, in remarkably fine condition, appeared at Sotheby's, London, in 2013. Others can be found at the Galleria Palatina, Florence; the Louvre, Paris; and the Museo Soumaya, Mexico City.

=== Later work ===
Botticini continued to work throughout the last decade of his career, receiving important commissions for Florence and its surroundings. Around 1490 he painted the Madonna and Child in Glory with Saints Mary Magdalen and Bernard, formerly at the Florentine church of the Cestello and now at the Louvre, and in 1493 he painted a Madonna and Child with Two Angels and Saints Benedict, Francis, Sylvester and Anthony Abbot for the Compagnia della Vergine in Fucecchio (west of Florence), now at the Metropolitan Museum of Art.

In the mid-1490s he completed his most ambitious late altarpiece, an imposing Saint Jerome with Saints and Angels (the San Gerolamo Altarpiece), commissioned by wealthy Rucellai family for the convent of San Girolamo, Fiesole. This work, now at the National Gallery in London, depicts Saint Jerome in the central panel between Pope Damasus, Saint Eusebius, Saint Paula and Saint Eustochium; six angels appear in the sky above and a group of donors kneel below. The painting is unusual for including the central saint in a separate frame, creating a sort of picture-within-a-picture. As described by art critic Charles Darwent, "By giving his picture-within-a-picture of St Jerome its own gilt frame, the artist (Botticini) sets up a sequence of overlapping realities. The framed image exists as a separate artwork for us, the viewer, but also for the painted saints who seem to study it: even holy martyrs, it says, can be moved by the power of art." A drawing once considered a study for the figure of the Saint Jerome in the altarpiece is now recognized as a work by Domenico Ghirlandaio and linked to a fresco of the saint at the Bargello, Florence, painted by Ghirlandaio's brother-in-law, Bastiano Mainardi.

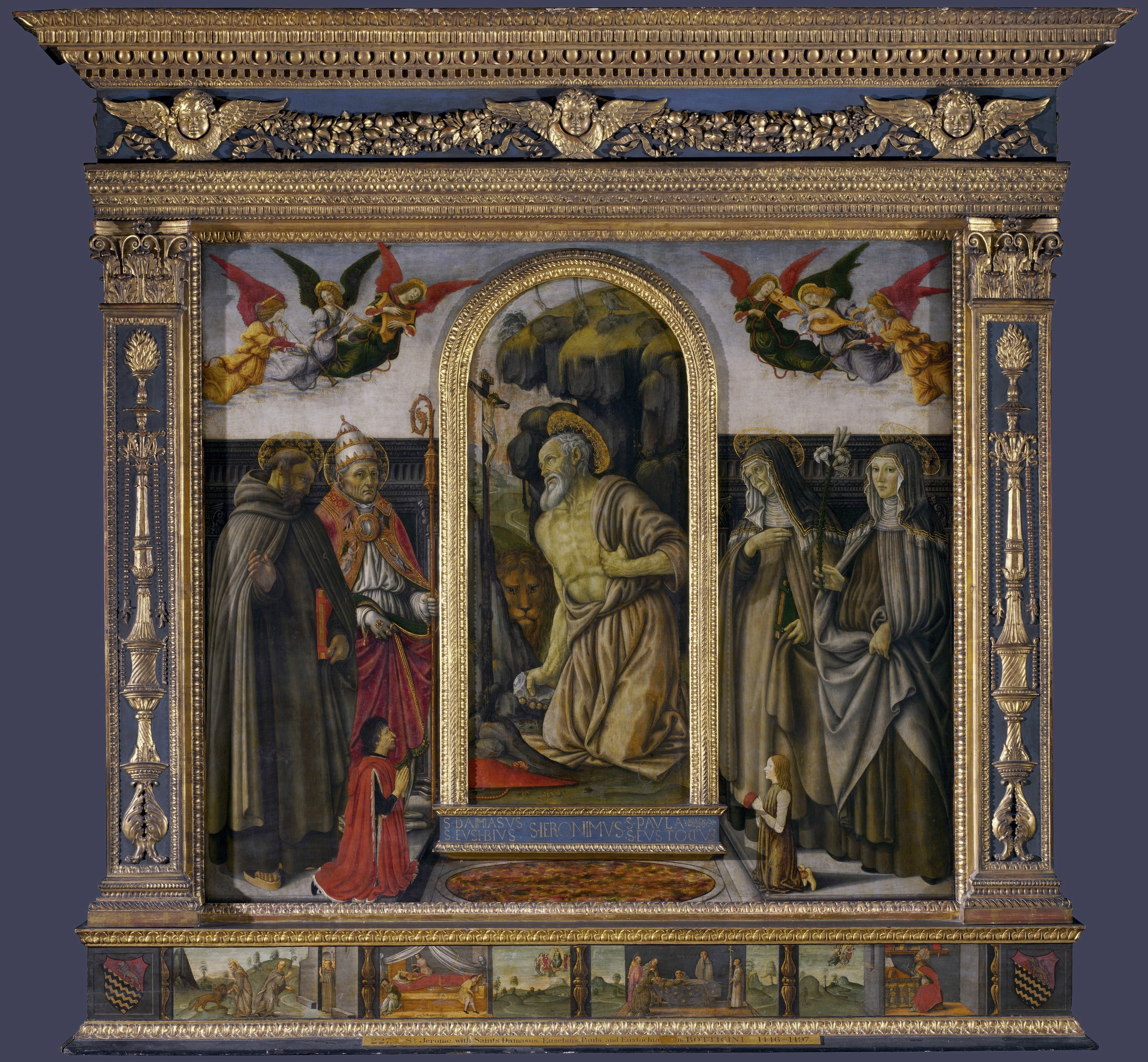
Saint Jerome with Angels and Saints (the Rucellai or San Gerolamo Altarpiece), late 1490s. London, National Gallery.

In 1495 Botticini painted an altarpiece of the Madonna and Child with Saint Francis, the Archangel Raphael and the Young Tobias for the Rinuccini chapel in San Pier Scheraggio, Florence. This work is now at the National Galleries of Scotland, Edinburgh, on loan from a private collection.

Botticini died in Florence on 16 January 1498 at the age of 51. His workshop was inherited by his son Raffaello Botticini, who had a prolific activity of his own.

== Posthumous reputation ==
In April 1968, Esquire Magazine imitated Botticini's Saint Sebastian at the Metropolitan Museum of Art in a cover shot of Muhammad Ali. The cover was meant to relate the persecution of Saint Sebastian to that of Muhammad Ali, when we was stripped of his heavyweight boxing title for refusing to serve in the Vietnam War. George Lois, the magazine's art director at the time, came up with the idea and pitched it to Ali. Ali initially liked the connection between the suffering of the Saint and himself, but initially refused to pose as a Christian. He eventually agreed after speaking with the leader of the Nation of Islam, Elijah Muhammad, and studying a postcard of Botticini's painting. The final product shows Ali with his hands bound behind him, arrows piercing his torso, his head tilted upwards in pain, in imitation of Botticini's saint.

== Sources and further reading ==
- Neri di Bicci, Le ricordanze, 1453–1475, edited by Bruno Santi (Pisa, 1976), pp. 126–7, 333 (Italian)
- Poggi, Giovanni. "Della tavola di Francesco di Giovanni Botticini per la Compagnia di Sant’Andrea di Empoli", Rivista d’arte, vol. 3 (1905): pp. 258–64.
- Kühnel, Ernst. Francesco Botticini. Strassburg: Heitz, 1906.
- Bacci, Piero. ‘Una tavola sconosciuta con San Sebastiano di Francesco di Giovanni Botticini’, Bollettino d'Arte, n.s. iv (1924–25): pp. 337–50.
- Degenhart, Bernhard. "Francesco Botticini," Old Master Drawings, vol. 5 (1931): p. 49.
- Van Marle, Raimond. The Development of Italian Schools of Painting, 19 vols (The Hague: Nijhoff, 1923–1938), vol. 13 (1931), pp. 390–427
- Shaw, James Byam. "Francesco Botticini," Old Master Drawings, vol. 9 (1935): p. 58.
- Davies, Martin. The Earlier Italian Schools (London: National Gallery, 1951, [Second Edition, 1961), pp. 118–27
- Berenson, Bernard. Italian Pictures of the Renaissance: Florentine School (London: Phaidon, 1963), p. 39
- Fahy, Everett. "Some Early Italian Pictures in the Gambier Parry Collection," The Burlington Magazine (1967): pp. 128–39.
- Bellosi, Luciano. "Intorno ad Andrea del Castagno," Paragone, vol. 9, no. 211 (1967): pp. 10–15.
- Berenson, Bernard. The Drawings of Florentine Painters, 2 vols (Chicago: University of Chicago, 1938, [Second Edition: 1969), vol. 1, p. 70, vol. 2, p. 61
- Zeri, Federico and Gardner, Elizabeth. The Metropolitan Museum of Art, Italian Paintings: Florentine School (New York: Metropolitan Museum of Art, 1971), pp. 125–7
- Padoa Rizzo, Anna. "Per Francesco Botticini," Antichità Viva, vol. 5/6 (1976): pp. 3–19
- King, Catherine. "The Dowry Farms of Niccolosa Serragli and the Altarpiece of the Assumption in the National Gallery London (1126) Ascribed to Francesco Botticini." Zeitschrift Für Kunstgeschichte 50, no. 2 (1987): 275–78.
- Griswold, William M., "Drawings by Francesco Botticini," Master Drawings, vol. 21, no. 2 (Summer 1994): pp. 151–4
- Venturini, Lisa, Francesco Botticini. Florence: Edifir, 1994.
- Padoa Rizzo, Anna, "Botticini, Francesco." Grove Art Online. Oxford Art Online Oxford: Oxford University Press, 1996. (accessed 21 February 2017)
- Bagemihl, Rolf, "Francesco Botticini's Palmieri Altar-Piece." The Burlington Magazine 138, no. 1118 (1996): pp. 308–14.
- Rubin, Patricia Lee, "Art and the imagery of memory", in Art, memory, and family in Renaissance Florence, edited by Giovanni Ciappelli and Patricia Lee Rubin (Cambridge: Cambridge University Press, 2000), pp. 67–85
- Sliwka, Jennifer, Visions of Paradise: Botticini's Palmieri Altarpiece. London: National Gallery, 2015.
