= Julian Rix =

American landscape artist

Julian Rix (1850–1903) was an American landscape artist.

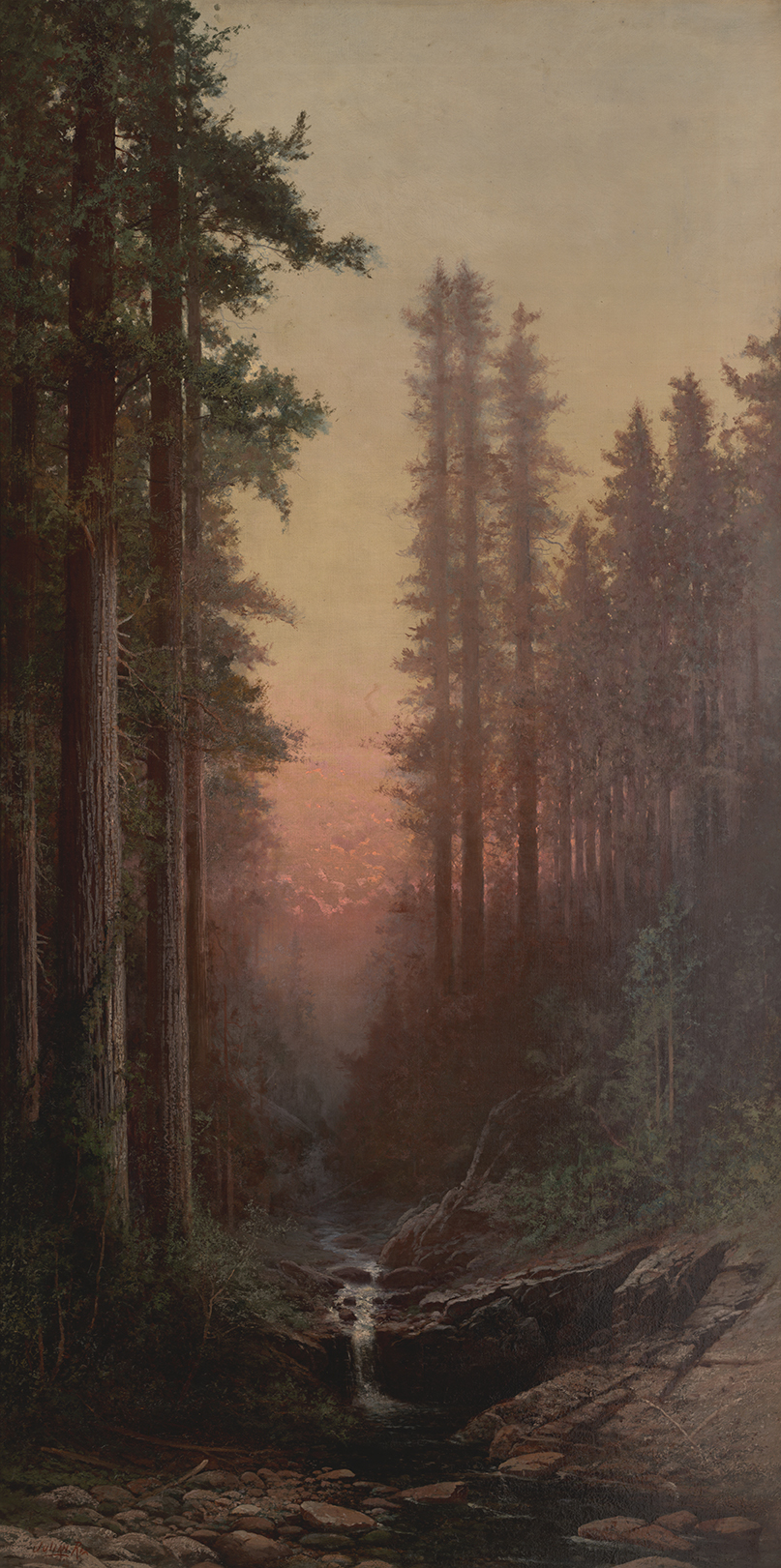
Redwoods (1873-1881) by Julian Rix, Haggin Museum.

== Biography ==
A native of Vermont, he lived in California where his artwork caught the attention of silk tycoon, William Ryle, of Paterson, New Jersey. Ryle financed Rix's work and many of his portraits hang in the halls of Lambert Castle in Paterson, New Jersey.

Rix died at his home in New York City in 1903.
