= Haggin Museum =

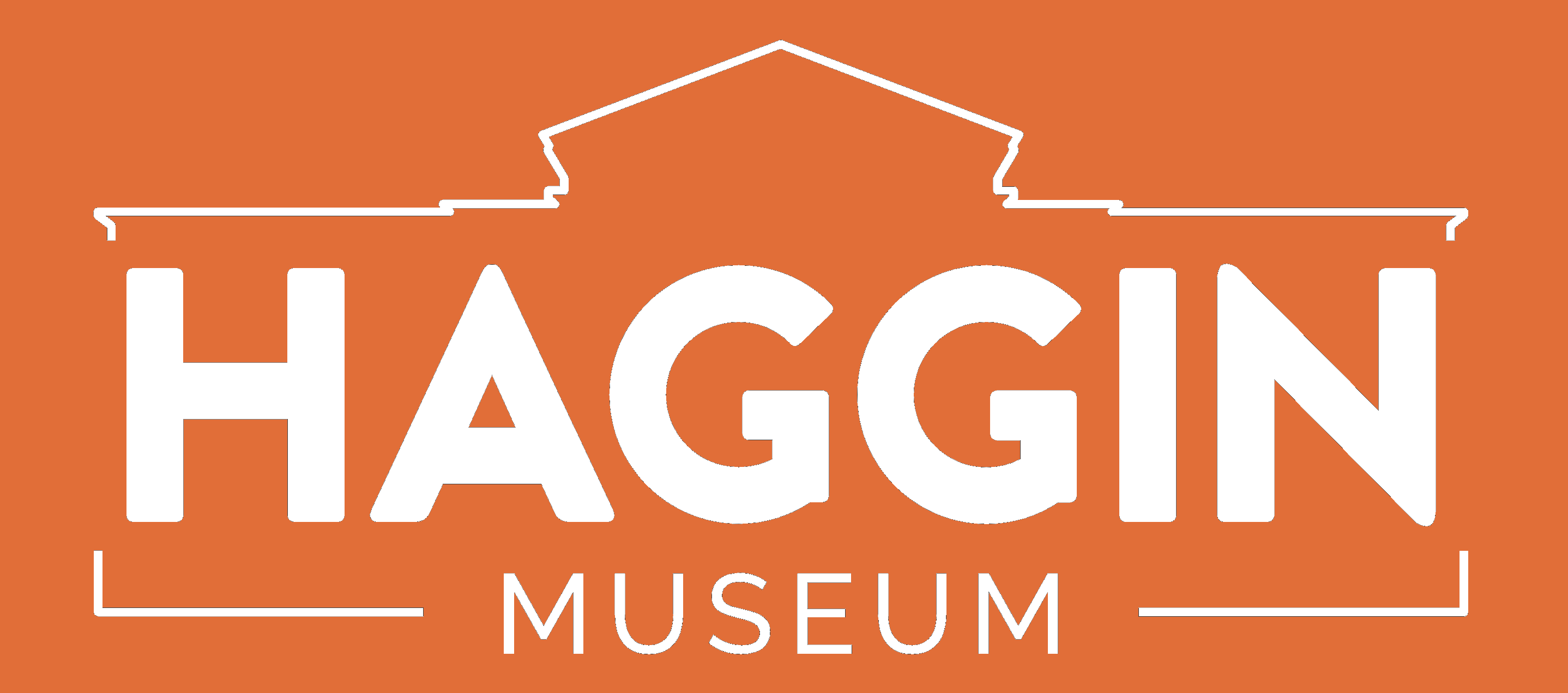

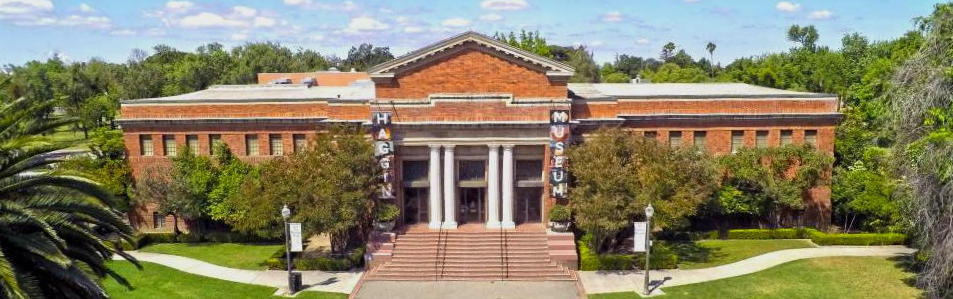
- The Haggin Museum in 2019
- Established: 1931
- Location: 1201 Pershing Avenue. Stockton, CA
- Coordinates: 37.960284°N 121.313991°W
- Type: Art museum, History museum
- Accreditation: American Alliance of Museums
- Key holdings: J. C. Leyendecker, Albert Bierstadt
- Website: www.hagginmuseum.org

The Haggin Museum is an art museum and local history museum in Stockton, San Joaquin County, California, located in the city's Victory Park. The museum opened in 1931. Its art collection includes works by European painters Jean Béraud, Rosa Bonheur, William-Adolphe Bouguereau, Jean-Léon Gérôme, and Pierre-Auguste Renoir, landscapes by French artists of the Barbizon school, and sculptures by René de Saint-Marceaux, Alfred Barye, and Auguste Rodin. The museum also features a number of works by Hudson River School and California landscape painters, including the largest collection of Albert Bierstadt works in the region. In 2017, it dedicated a gallery to display its collection of original artworks by J. C. Leyendecker; it is the largest public collection in the United States, with much of it donated by the artist's sister.

== History of the building ==
Upon formation in 1928, the San Joaquin Pioneer and Historical Society listed several objectives in its Articles of Incorporation: to develop educational facilities for the study of history, to collect documents and articles of historical interest, and to establish and maintain a museum where such items could be stored and displayed. Stockton native Robert McKee and his wife, Eila Haggin McKee, offered the group $30,000, with two stipulations: that the museum be named in honor of her late father, Louis Terah Haggin (the son of James Ben Ali Haggin), and that it include galleries to house her parents' art collection. The Louis Terah Haggin Memorial Galleries and San Joaquin Pioneer Historical Museum opened its doors to the public on 14 June 1931, Flag Day.

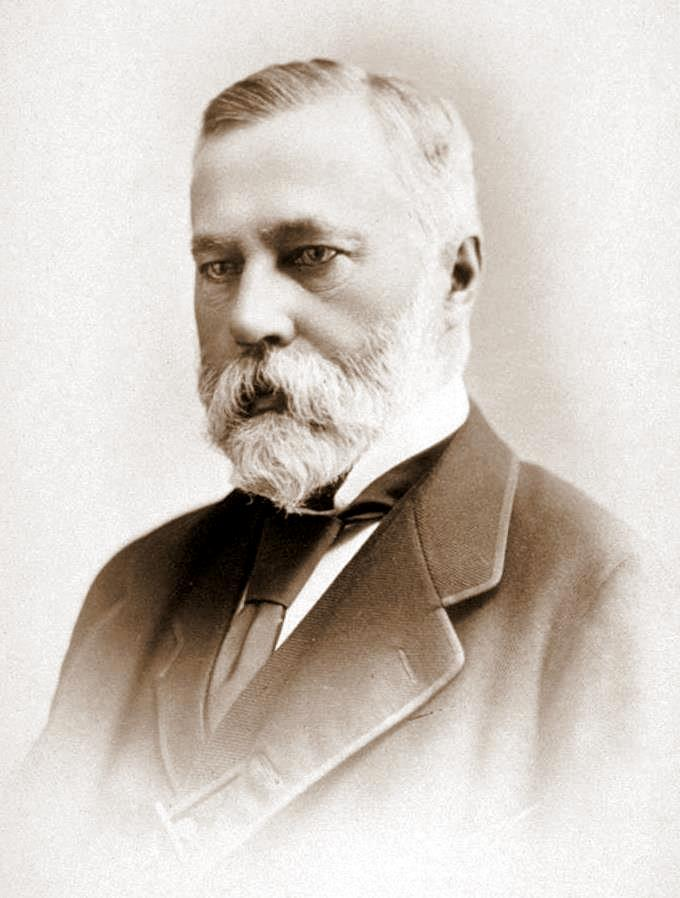
James Ben Ali Haggin, Gold Rush tycoon and originator of the collection. Simplified family tree of the creators and owners of the Haggin art collection.

Upon her death in 1936, though she never visited in person, Eila Haggin McKee left the institution $500,000. Further, to honor her memory, Robert McKee donated funds for the building's first addition, which included storage space on the ground floor and a vestibule and large gallery on the second. When it opened in December 1939, the room now known as the McKee Gallery contained paintings, furniture, and decorative art from the couple's New York residence, and overlooked the rose garden.

In 1948, Stockton architect Howard G. Bissel drew up plans for a 15,500 square foot addition along the western edge of the existing structure. Principal funding came from the estates of Robert McKee and of rancher Jennie Hunter, and a significant gift from Irving Martin Sr., owner of the Stockton Record. The new exhibit areas, including the California Room, the Jennie Hunter Rooms, the West Gallery, and the lower level Arms Gallery and Vehicle Gallery, opened in 1949.

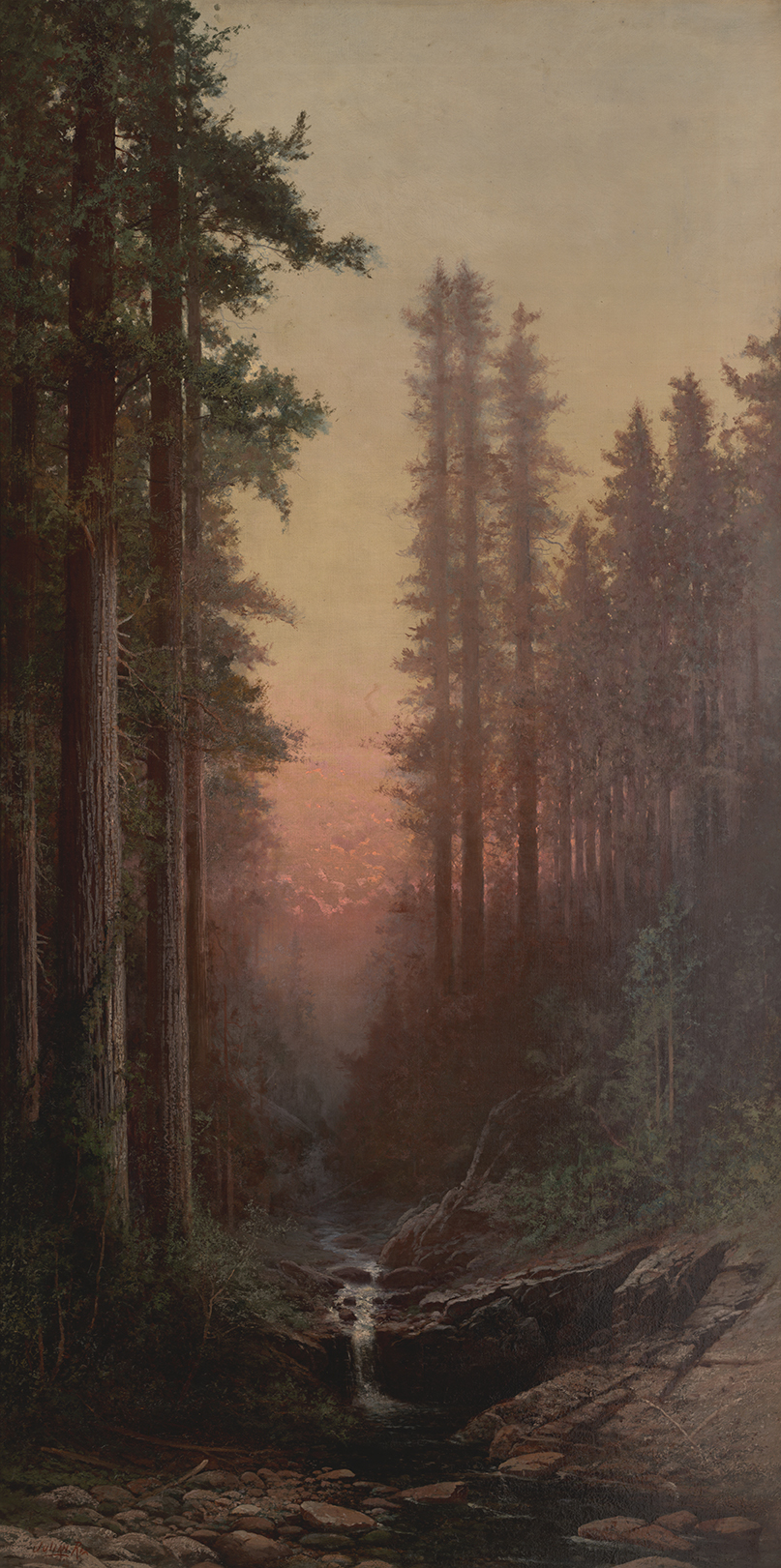
Redwoods (1873-1881) by Julian Rix.

In 1976, a major gift from William Knox Holt funded construction of a wing named for his father, the Benjamin Holt Wing, with a gallery showcasing Holt's contributions to the mechanization of agriculture, including a restored Holt 75 Caterpillar tractor. The Holt gift also funded construction of environmentally controlled storage facilities, offices, and the museum's library and archive.

In 2017 the museum completed a $2.5 million renovation of its galleries, which included permanent gallery space for displaying a large portion of the museum's extensive collection of the work of J. C. Leyendecker. The museum's three-story building now contains more than 34,000 square feet of exhibition space.

== History galleries ==
The Pioneer Room, the principal history gallery during the museum's early years, displayed artifacts and archival material collected since 1868 by the San Joaquin Society of California Pioneers.

The Victorian furnishings of the Jennie Hunter Rooms evoke life in the Central Valley during the late 19th and early 20th centuries. The contents were bequeathed to the museum by Miss Jennie Hunter, a local rancher, alumna of Mills College, and Daughter of San Joaquin County Pioneers, with the proviso that they be displayed just as they had been arranged in her home. The result is an almost uncanny peek into the past.

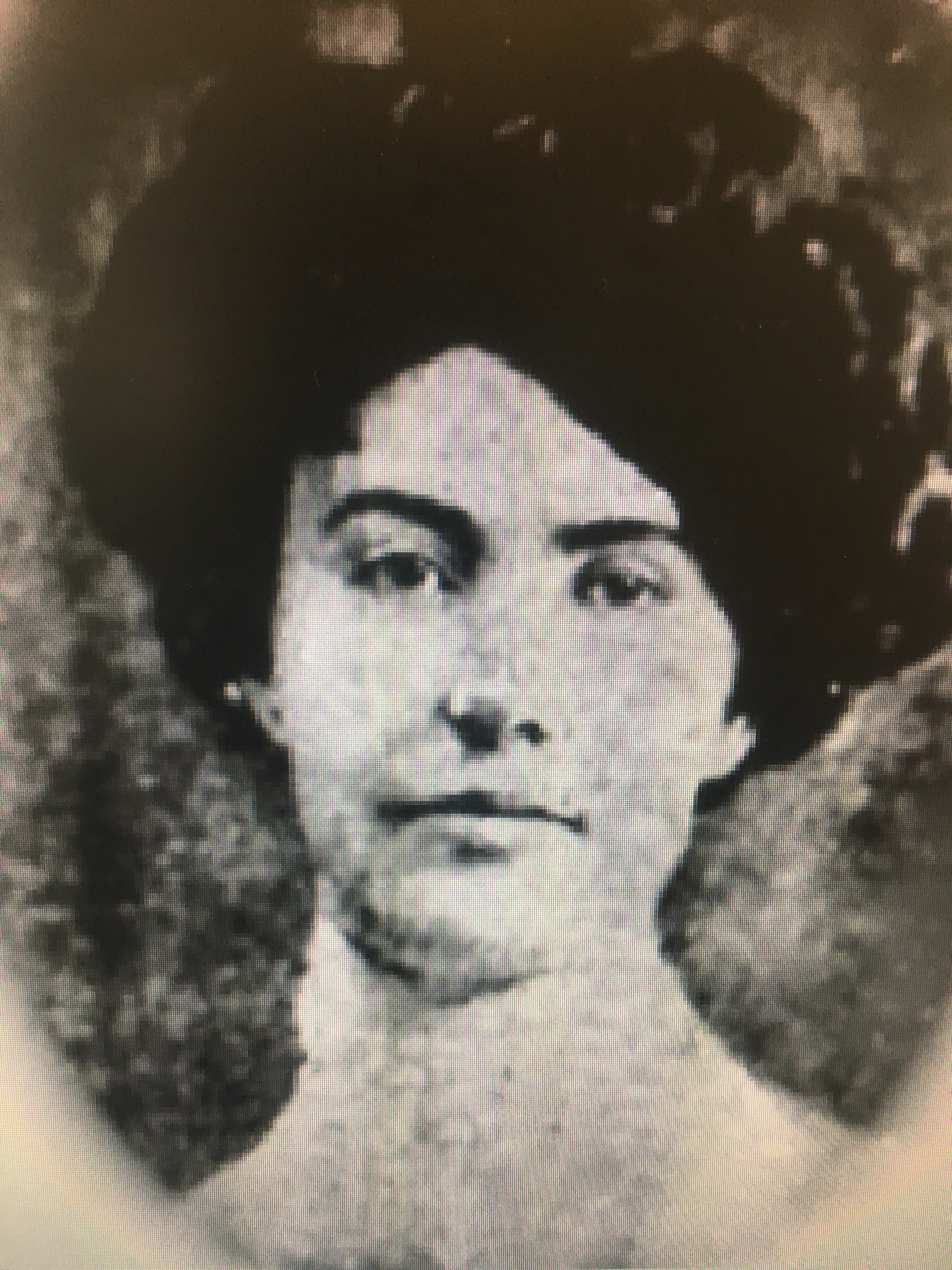
Emma LeDoux, perpetrator of Stockton's infamous "trunk murder of 1906."

Other exhibits focus on Native Americans, the Gold Rush, agriculture in the San Joaquin Valley, historic firefighting equipment, a recreated local flour mill, as well as shipbuilding and other Stockton industries. The displays known as the Storefronts are recreations of businesses and rooms typical of establishments in San Joaquin County between 1890 and 1915, including a one-room schoolhouse and a Chinese herb shop.

Also among the thousands of historical items permanently on display are a World War II jeep and the trunk used by murderer Emma LeDoux in the infamous "trunk murder of 1906."

== Art galleries and collection ==
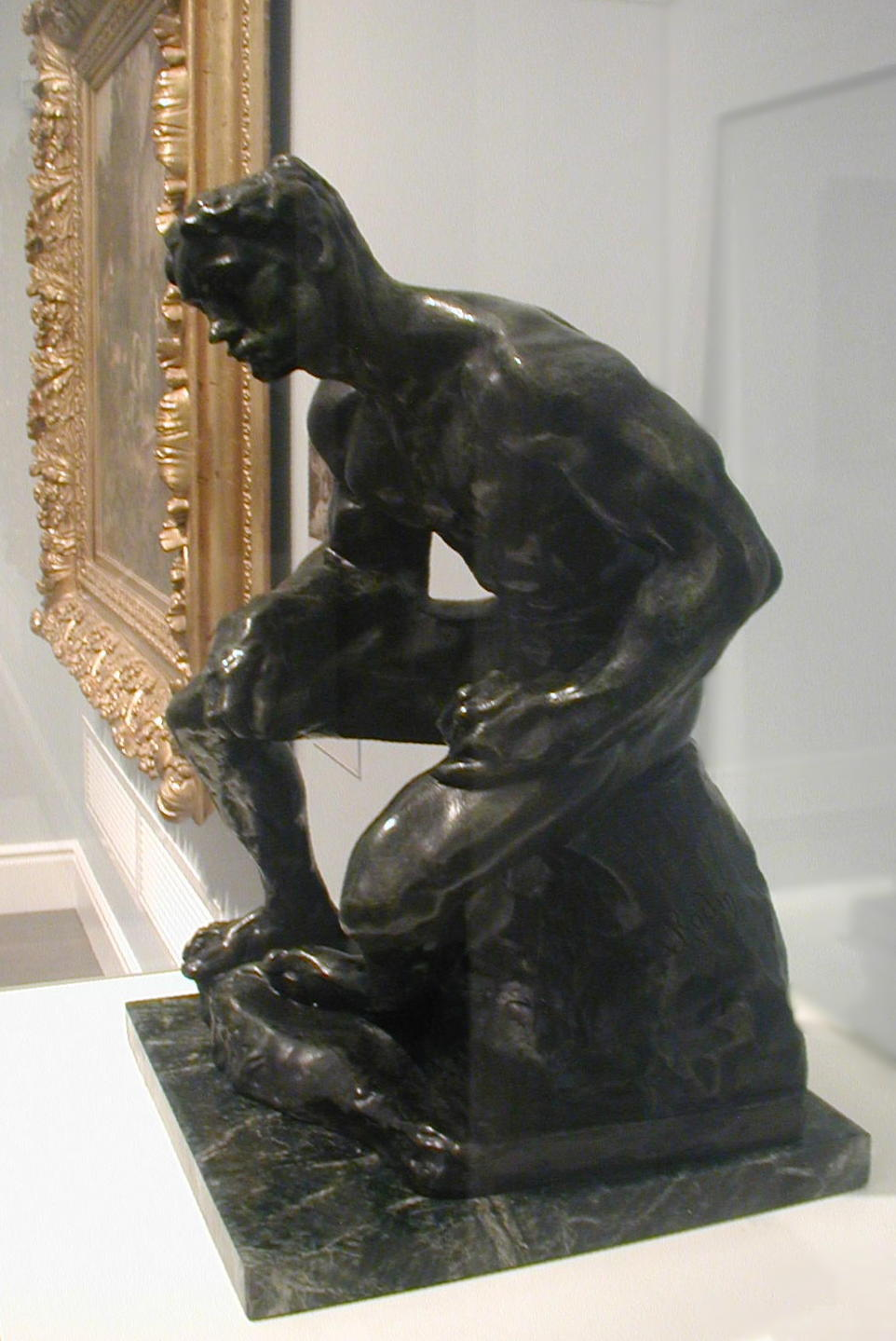
The Athlete (c. 1901–1904) by Auguste Rodin.

Eila Haggin McKee's grandfather, the Gold Rush tycoon James Ben Ali Haggin, collected art to decorate the walls of his 61-room Nob Hill mansion. However, it was her father, Louis Terah Haggin, and her mother, San Francisco socialite Blanche Butterworth Haggin, who assembled the majority of the Haggin Collection. Louis and Blanche both spoke fluent French and maintained a residence in Paris, where they entertained artists, writers, and European nobility. Their growing collection came to fill their homes in San Francisco, Paris, and New York City.

Typical of art collections assembled after the Civil War by wealthy Americans, the Haggin Collection reflects the work of conservative Realism painters of the latter part of the 19th century. It is characterized by Louis and Blanche's penchant for landscapes, genre, and animal paintings. They avoided religious or historical paintings. They eschewed the nude, Nymphaeum by William-Adolphe Bouguereau being a notable exception to this rule. And like their contemporaries, the Haggins assembled a collection that was encyclopedic and international in nature, featuring one or two works from a broad sampling of artists. Certain artists were collected in depth, however, including Jean Béraud, Albert Bierstadt, Rosa Bonheur, Jean-Léon Gérôme, Edward Lamson Henry, Barend Cornelis Koekkoek, Eugène Joseph Verboeckhoven and Jehan Georges Vibert. Approximately one-third of the collection is composed of works by American artists and the remaining two-thirds by European painters. Of the European art, French works are the most numerous.

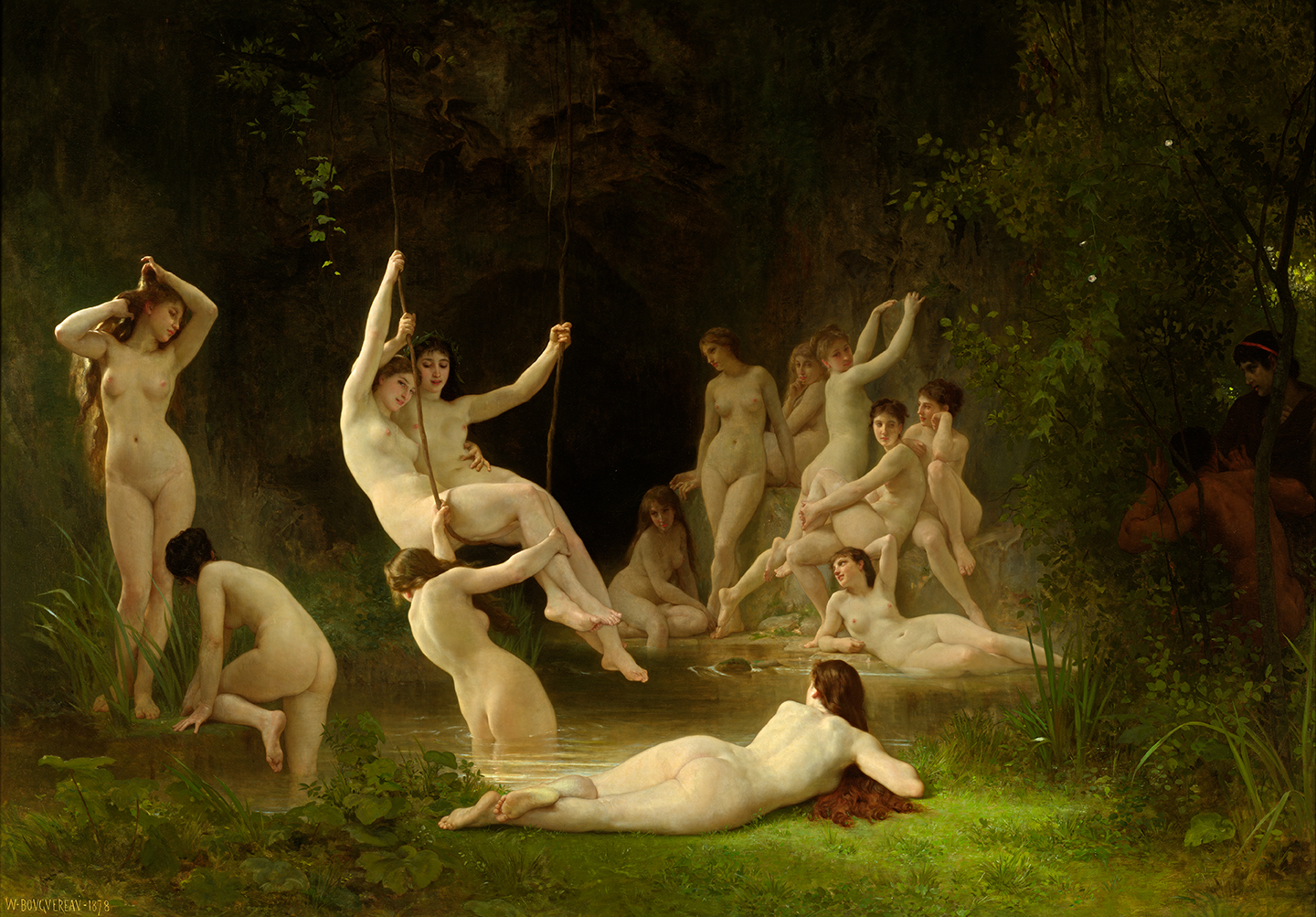
Exception to the rule: Nymphaeum (1878) by William-Adolphe Bouguereau.

Initially, Mrs. McKee gave the San Joaquin Pioneer and Historical Society 180 paintings, most of them part of the $10 million estate she inherited following the death of her father in March 1929. Both Eila and her husband Robert arranged for additional paintings to be bequeathed to the museum upon their deaths. Today the Haggin Collection totals nearly 240 works, of which approximately 75 are on view in the museum's art galleries at any one time. A catalog of the paintings, The Haggin Collection, compiled and written by Dr. Patricia Sanders, was published in 1991.

A hall between the two European art galleries displays Haggin and McKee family memorabilia, including portraits, photographs, and personal items including one of Eila's evening gowns and the World War I American Red Cross uniform she wore in France.

Although the core of the museum's art collection is derived from gifts from the Haggin and McKee families, it has been significantly augmented through gifts and purchases, including works by American and European artists of the late 19th and early 20th centuries that complement the original Haggin gifts. Notable is Rodin's The Athlete (c. 1901–1904). The museum has also assembled collections of Japanese woodblock prints, illuminated manuscripts, paintings by American illustrators such as J. C. Leyendecker and Maxfield Parrish, and both Western and Asian decorative arts.

== Library/Archives ==
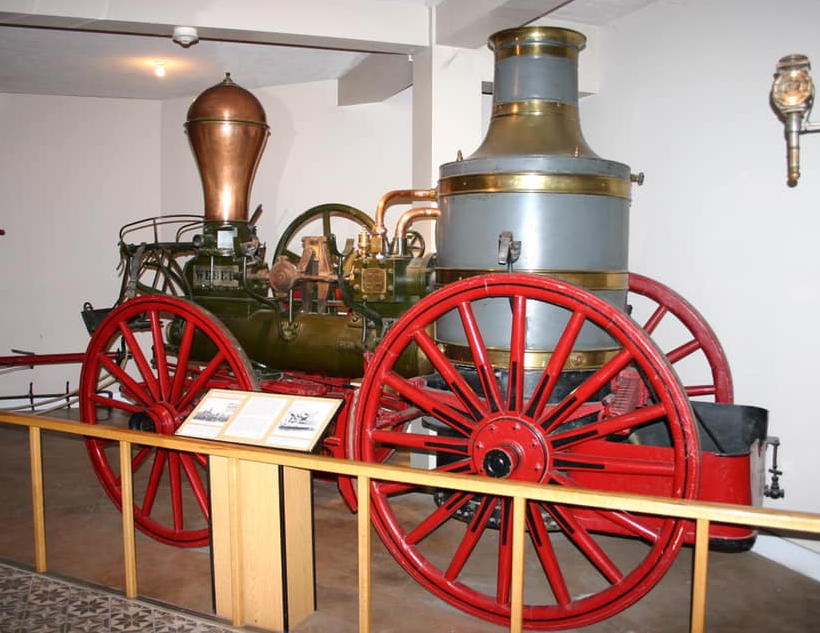
Old Betsy, a steam-powered fire engine from 1862, is displayed with other antique firefighting equipment in the Vehicle Gallery.

The Haggin Museum's Library/Archives began with material donated to the museum in 1931 by the San Joaquin Society of California Pioneers, comprising a wide-ranging collection of historical artifacts, photographs, ledgers, journals, correspondence, and other ephemera. Today there are some 10,000 volumes in the library. Approximately two-thirds are history related, and one-third deal with art and art history. The latter make up the Earl Rowland Art Library, named in honor of the museum's longest-serving director.

The majority of the history volumes are part of the Almeda Mae Petzinger Library, named after the benefactor who bestowed a generous endowment to help maintain the library in perpetuity. There are more than 600 archival boxes and some 100 flat files filled with photographs, maps, business records, greeting cards, advertising, and other items in the library stack room. A separate facility, the Betty H. Schroebel Stockton Historic Center, houses materials that relate specifically to the city's past.

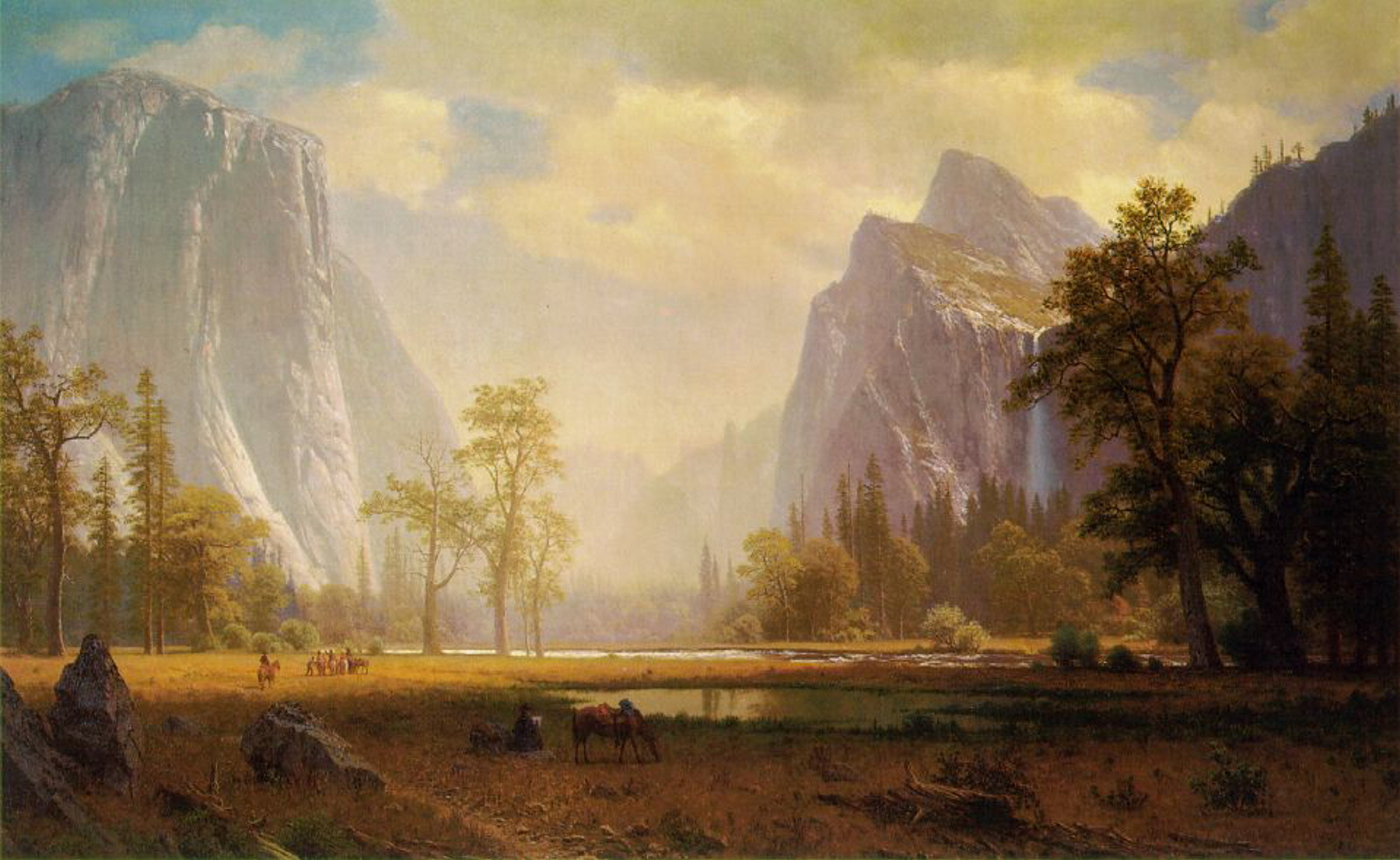
Looking up the Yosemite Valley (1865-1867) by Albert Bierstadt was borrowed by President Ronald Reagan to decorate the White House press room.

The Agricultural & Industrial Archives were established in 1984 with a grant from the William Knox Holt Foundation. The history of Holt Manufacturing Company, the local industry that developed the side-hill combine harvester and the Caterpillar track-type tractor, is documented in photographs, drawings, business records, operators' manuals, and advertising. The Archives also include records and drawings of Stephens Bros. Boat Builders, designers of commercial and pleasure watercraft; material from the Stockton Iron Works, which built dredges that helped construct the San Joaquin River Delta levees; the Tillie Lewis collection, which preserves the history of Stockton's preeminent "Tomato Queen" agri-businesswoman; and material from Sperry Flour Company.

The Haggin's library also includes a large collection of work by Ralph O. Yardley, editorial cartoonist for the Stockton Record from 1922 to 1952. During this long tenure he produced a series of more than 1400 cartoons published weekly under the title "Do You Remember?" that dealt with local homes, businesses, buildings, organizations, special events, and everyday life. The museum has more than 1100 of these nostalgic glimpses into the city's past.

== Gallery ==
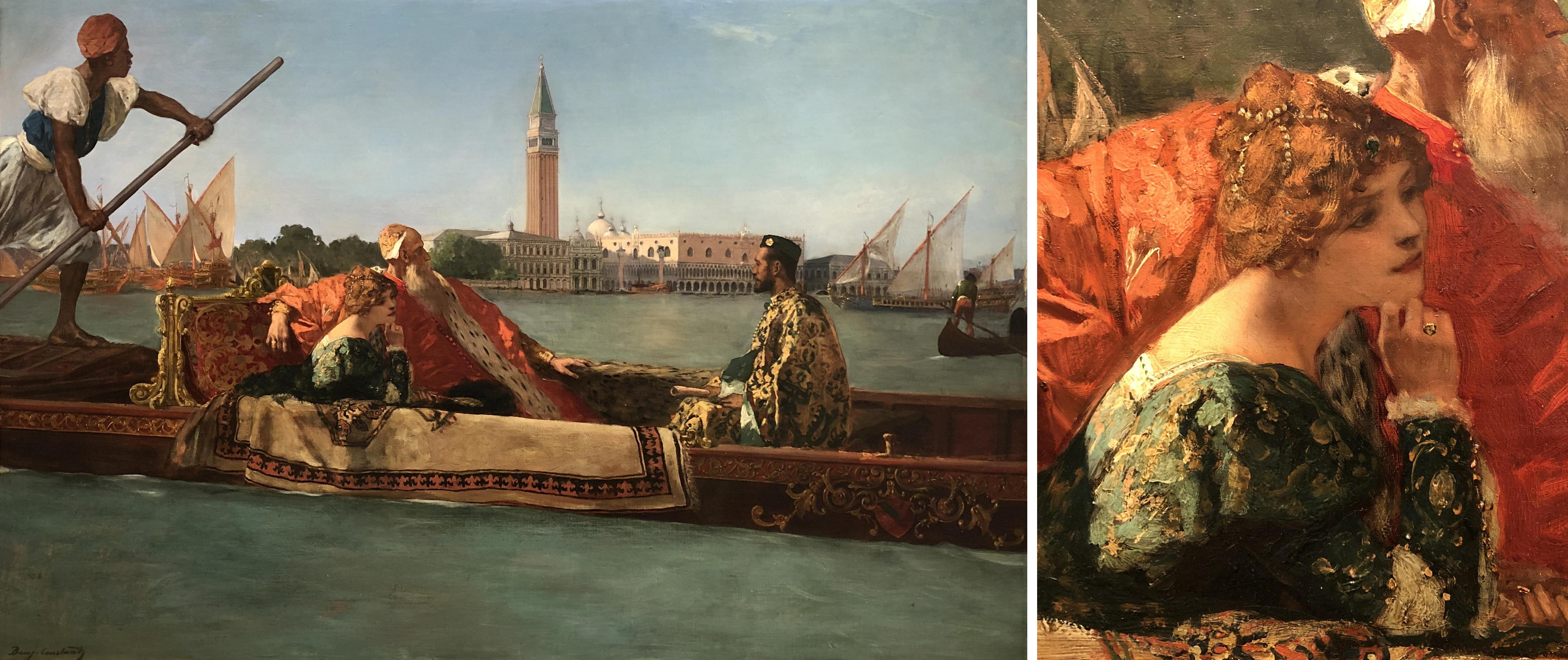
Doge of Venice by Jean-Joseph Benjamin-Constant, c. 1889, with detail showing the female figure modeled on the painting's original owner, Blanche Butterworth Haggin.
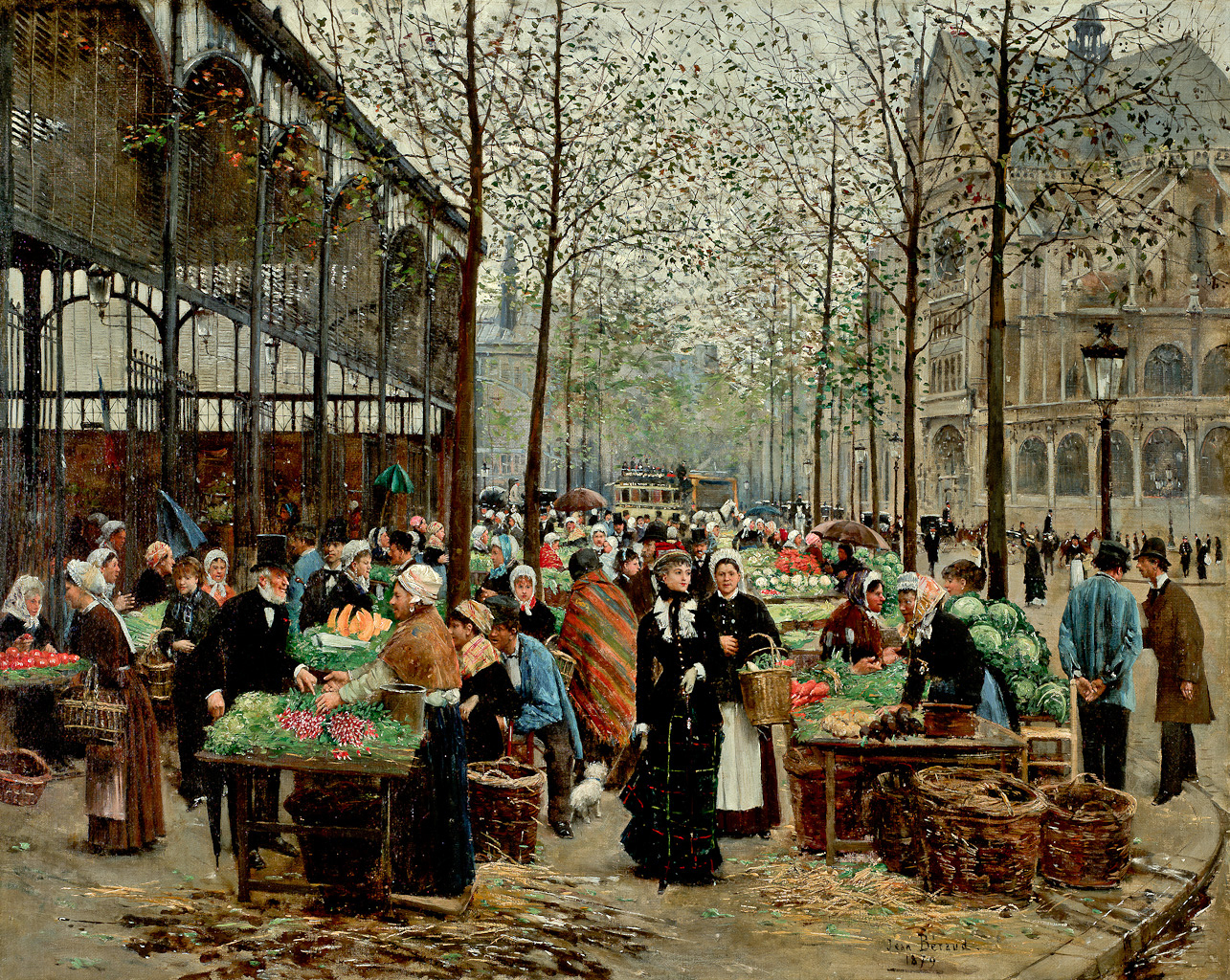
Les Halles (1879) by Jean Béraud

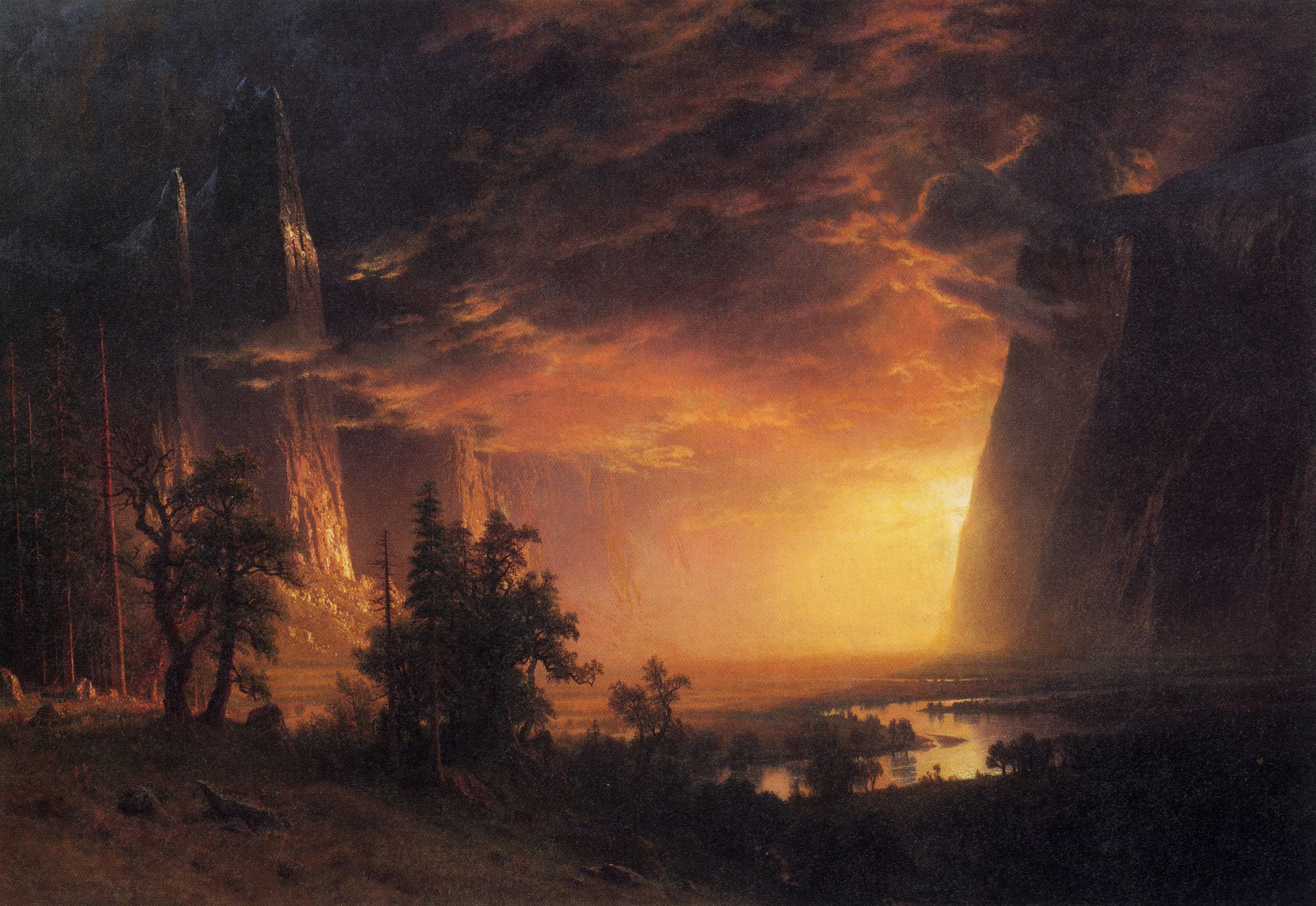
Sunset in the Yosemite Valley (c. 1868) by Albert Bierstadt

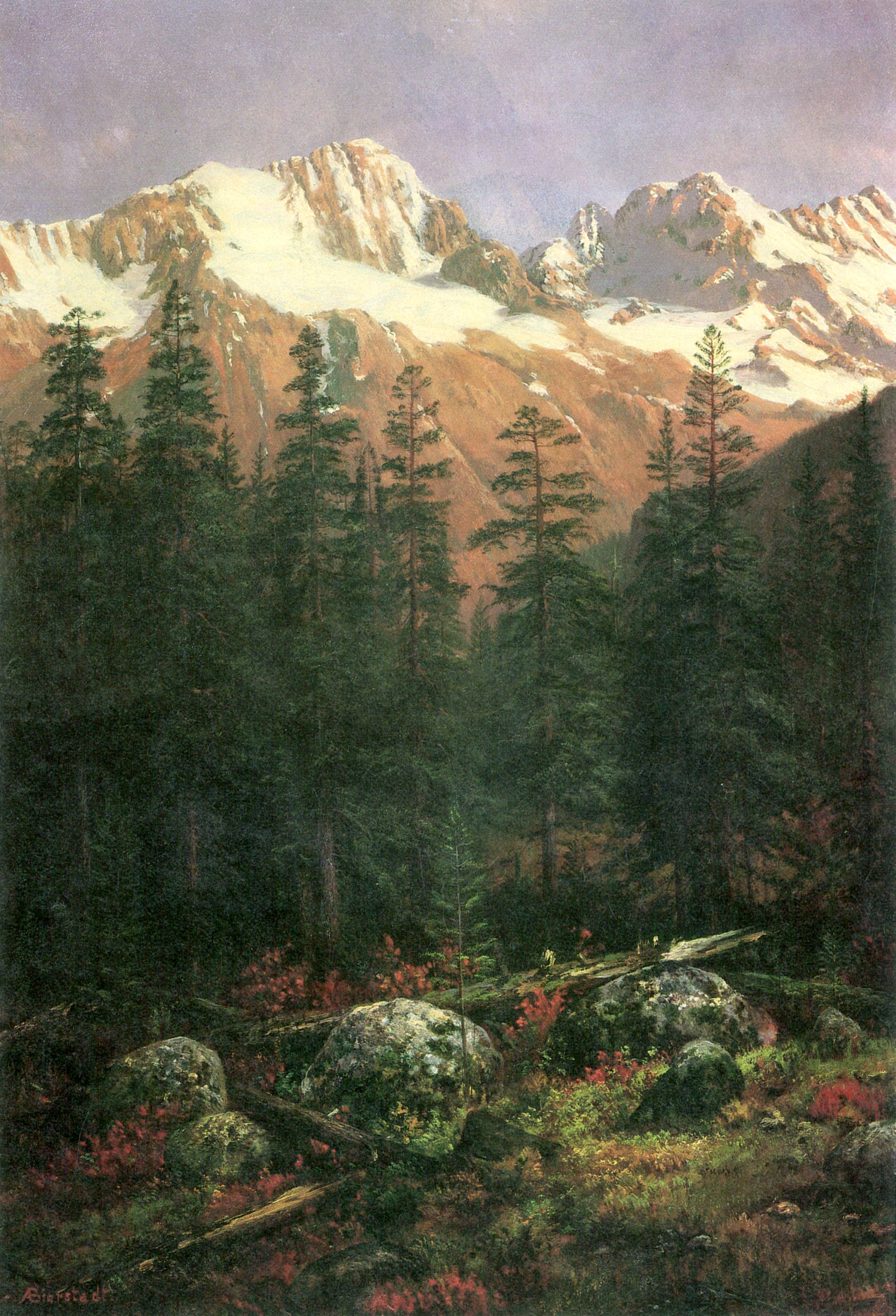
Canadian Rockies (c. 1889) by Albert Bierstadt

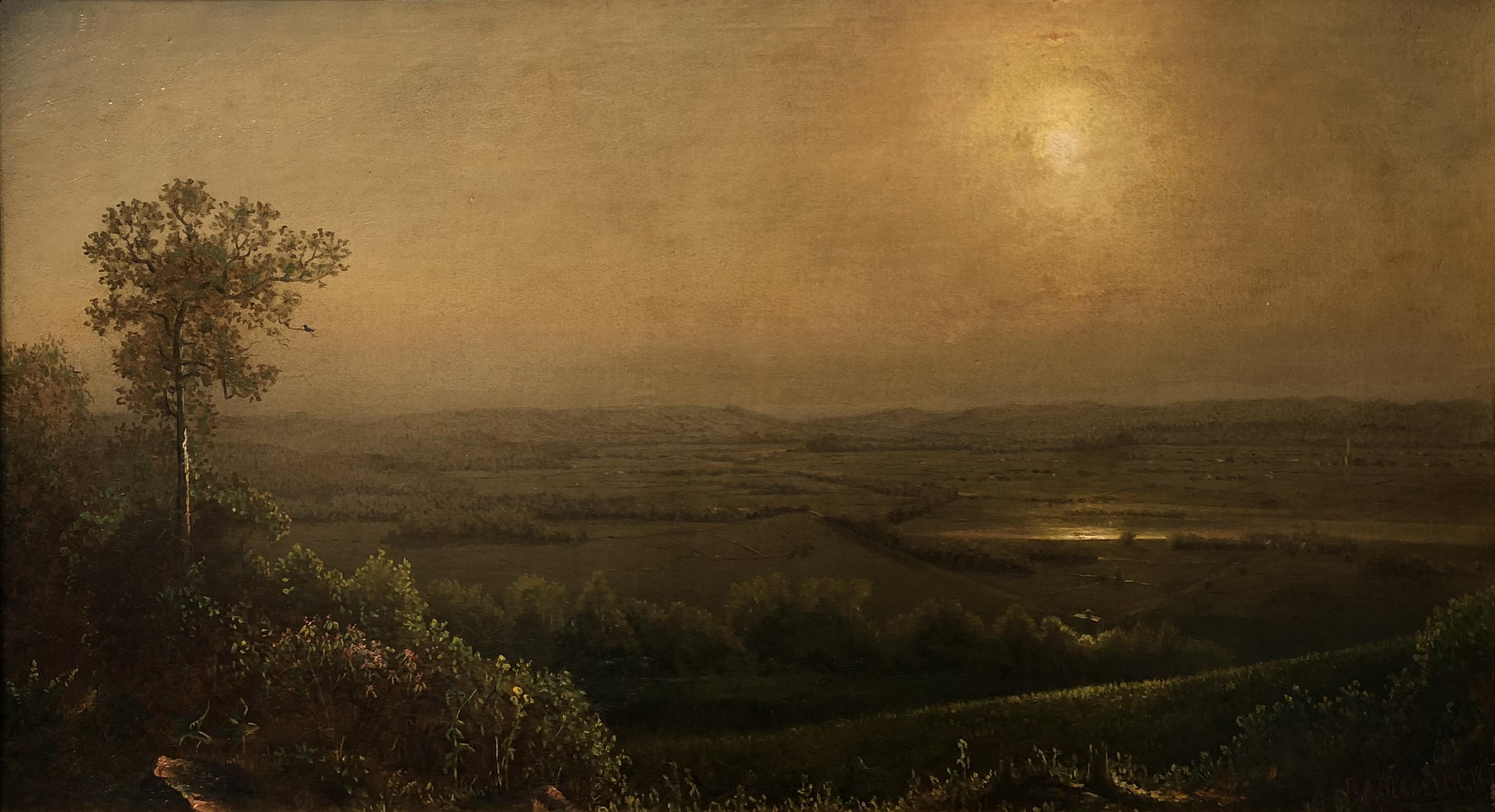
Evening (between 1880 and 1890) by Ralph Blakelock

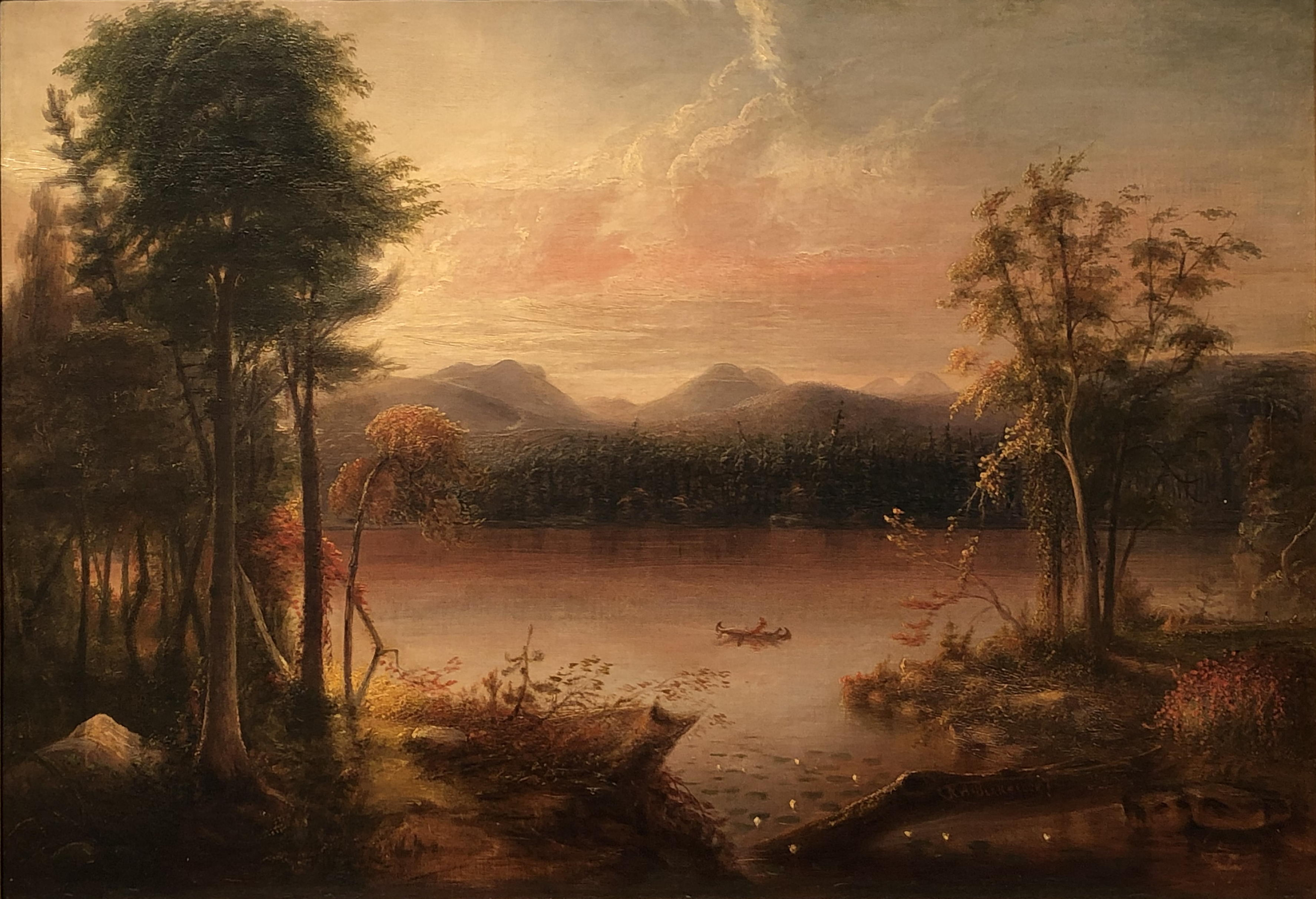
The Canoe (between 1880 and 1890) by Ralph Blakelock

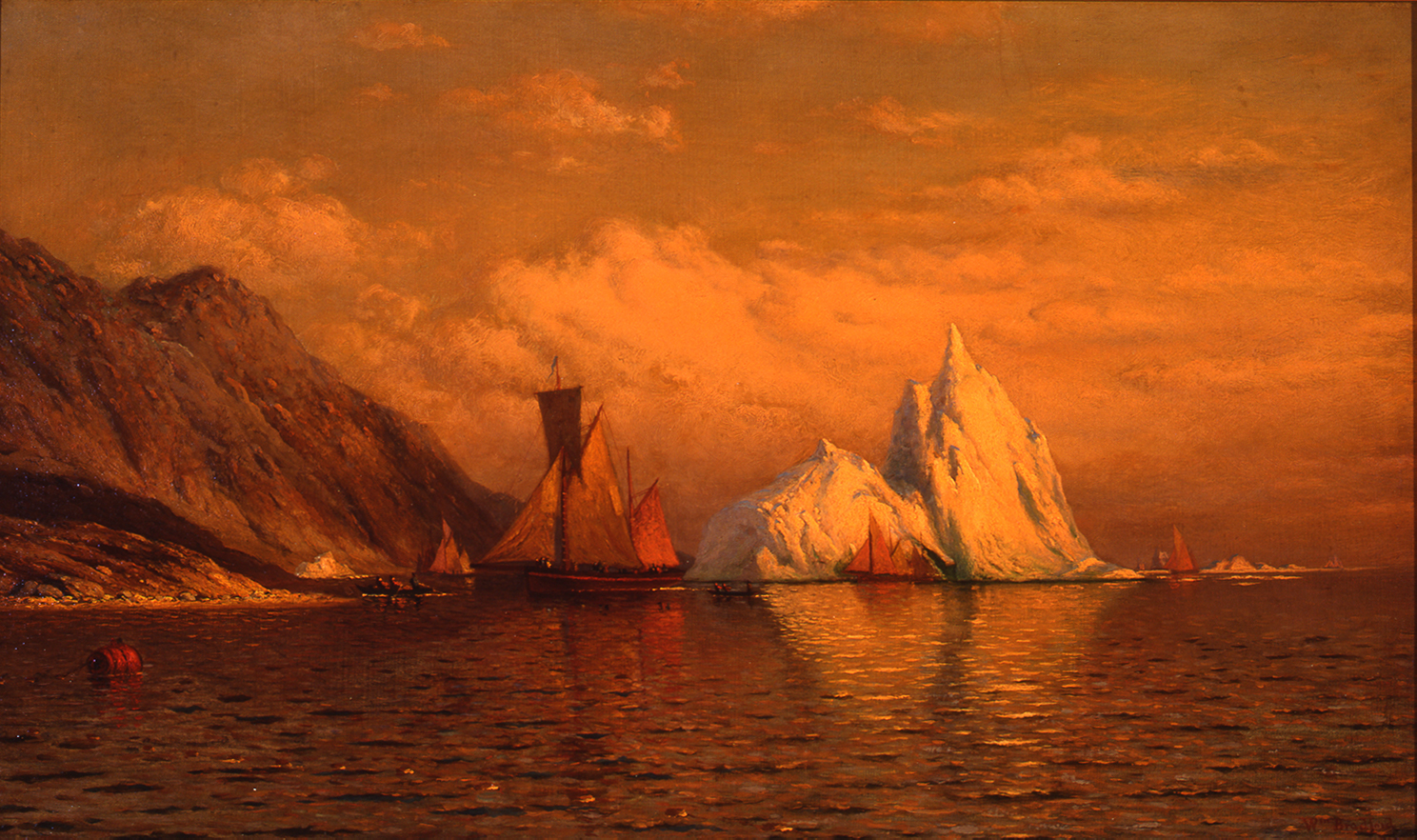
Afterglow (1870-1875) by William Bradford

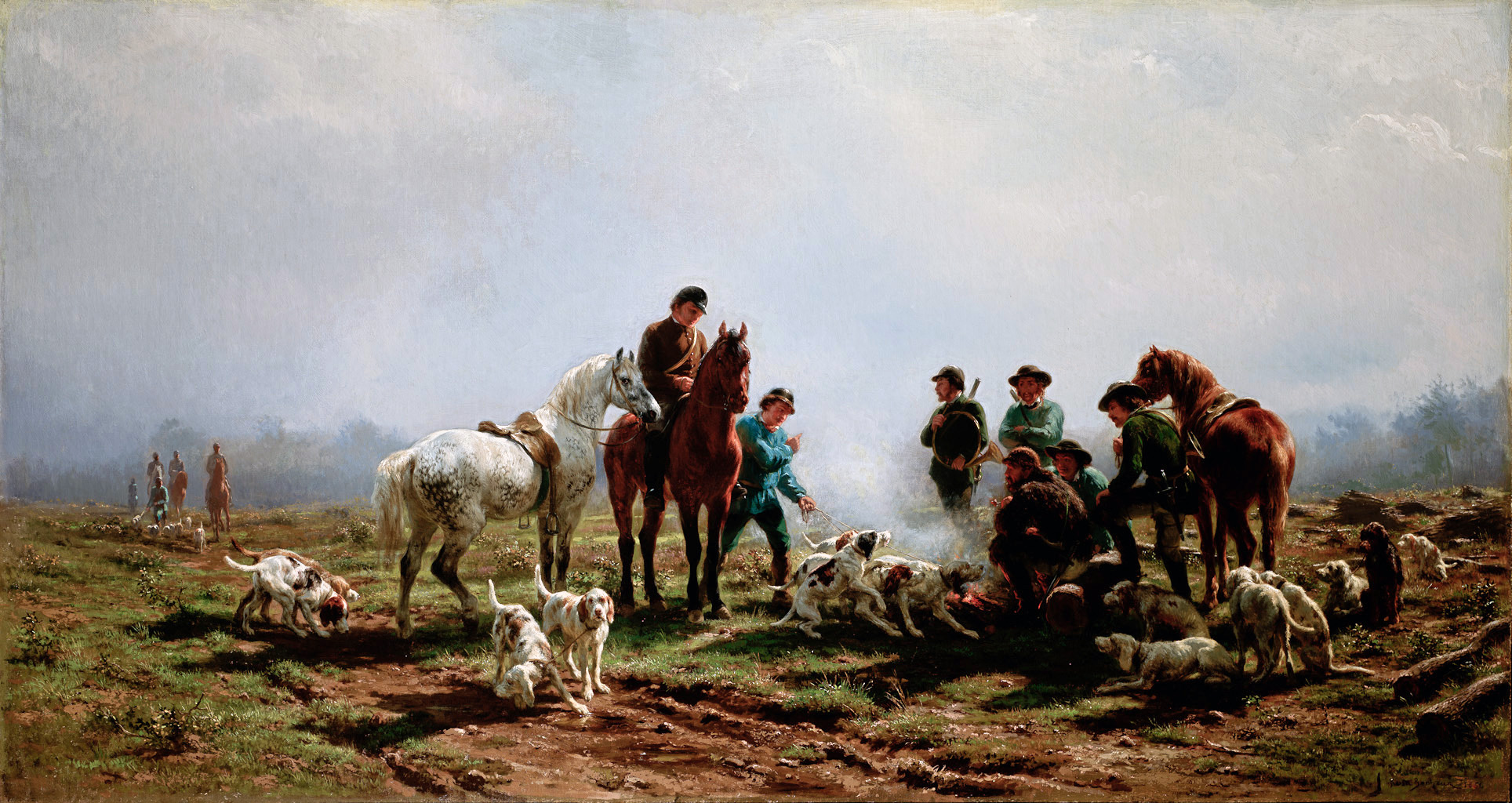
Gathering for the Hunt (1856) by Rosa Bonheur

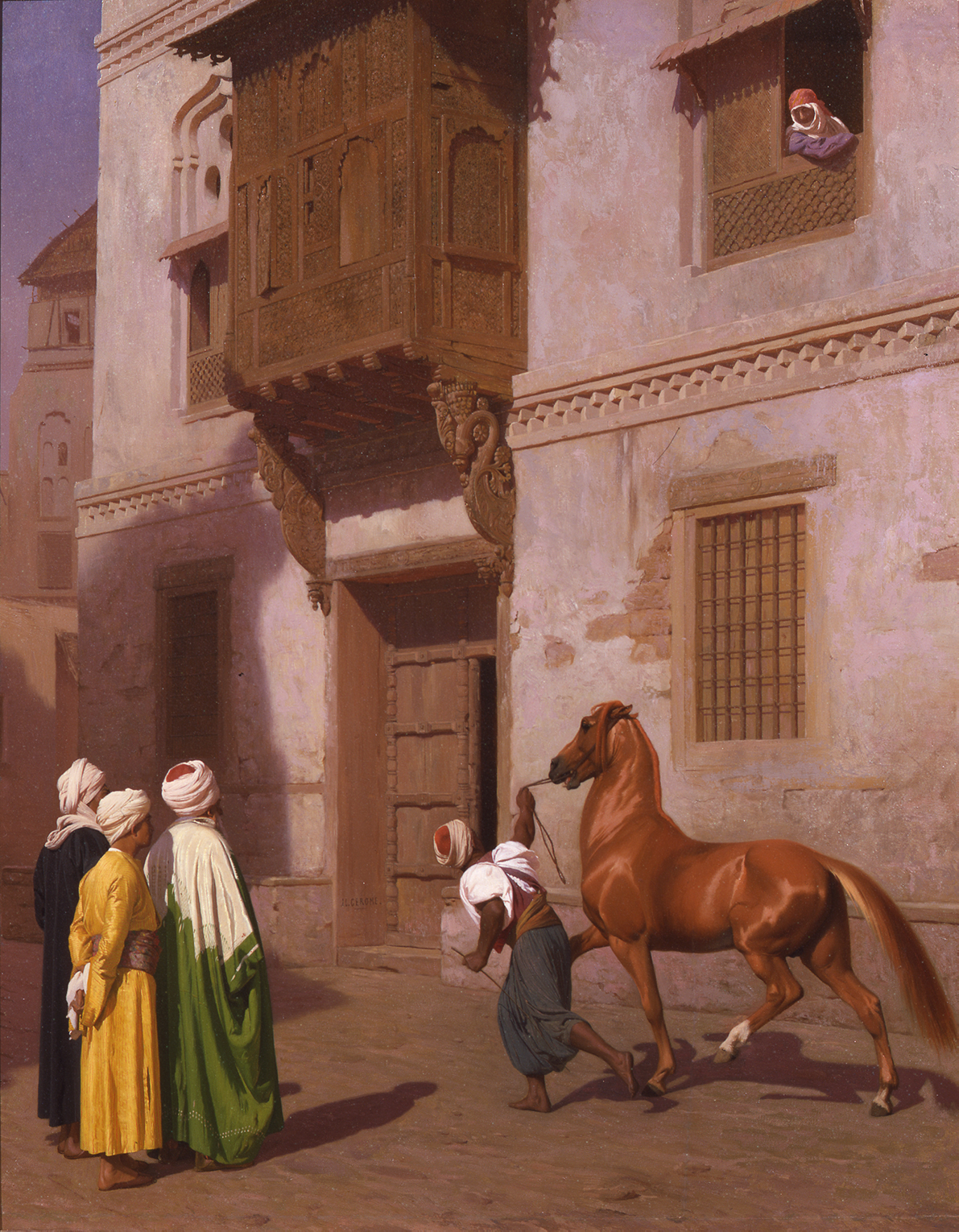
The Horse Market (1867) by Jean-Léon Gérôme

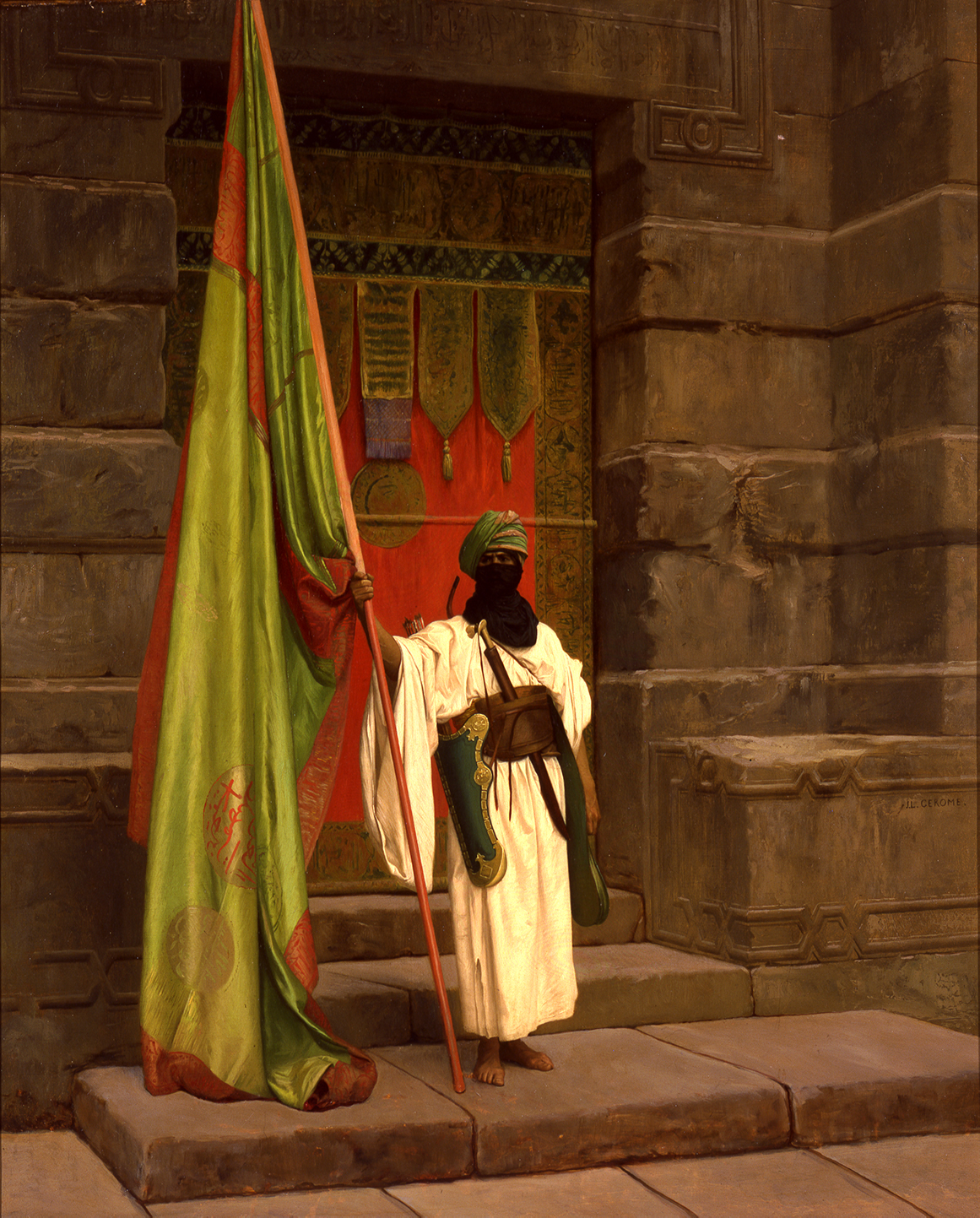
The Standing Bearer, Unfolding the Holy Flag (1876) by Jean-Léon Gérôme

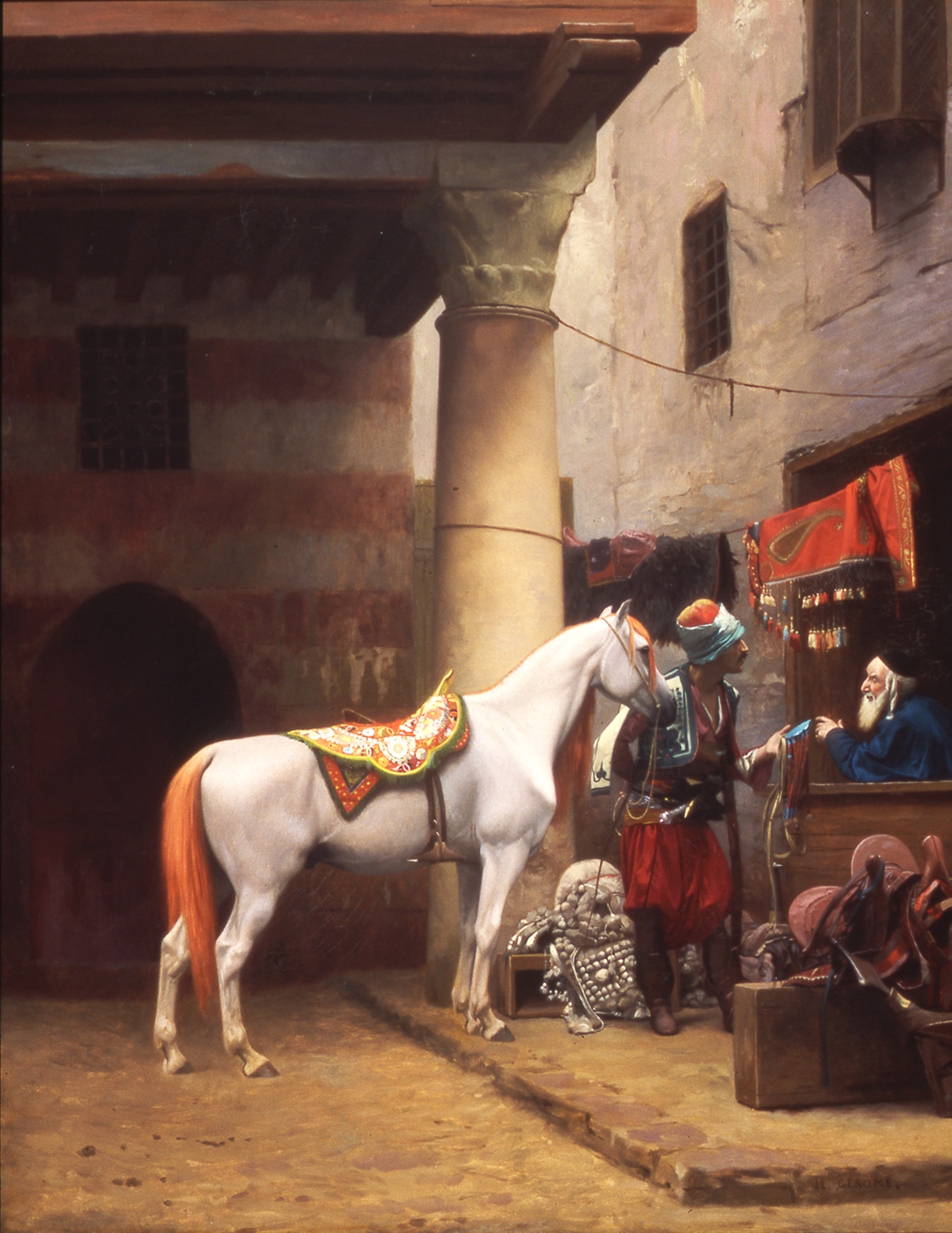
The Saddle Bazaar, Cairo (1883) by Jean-Léon Gérôme

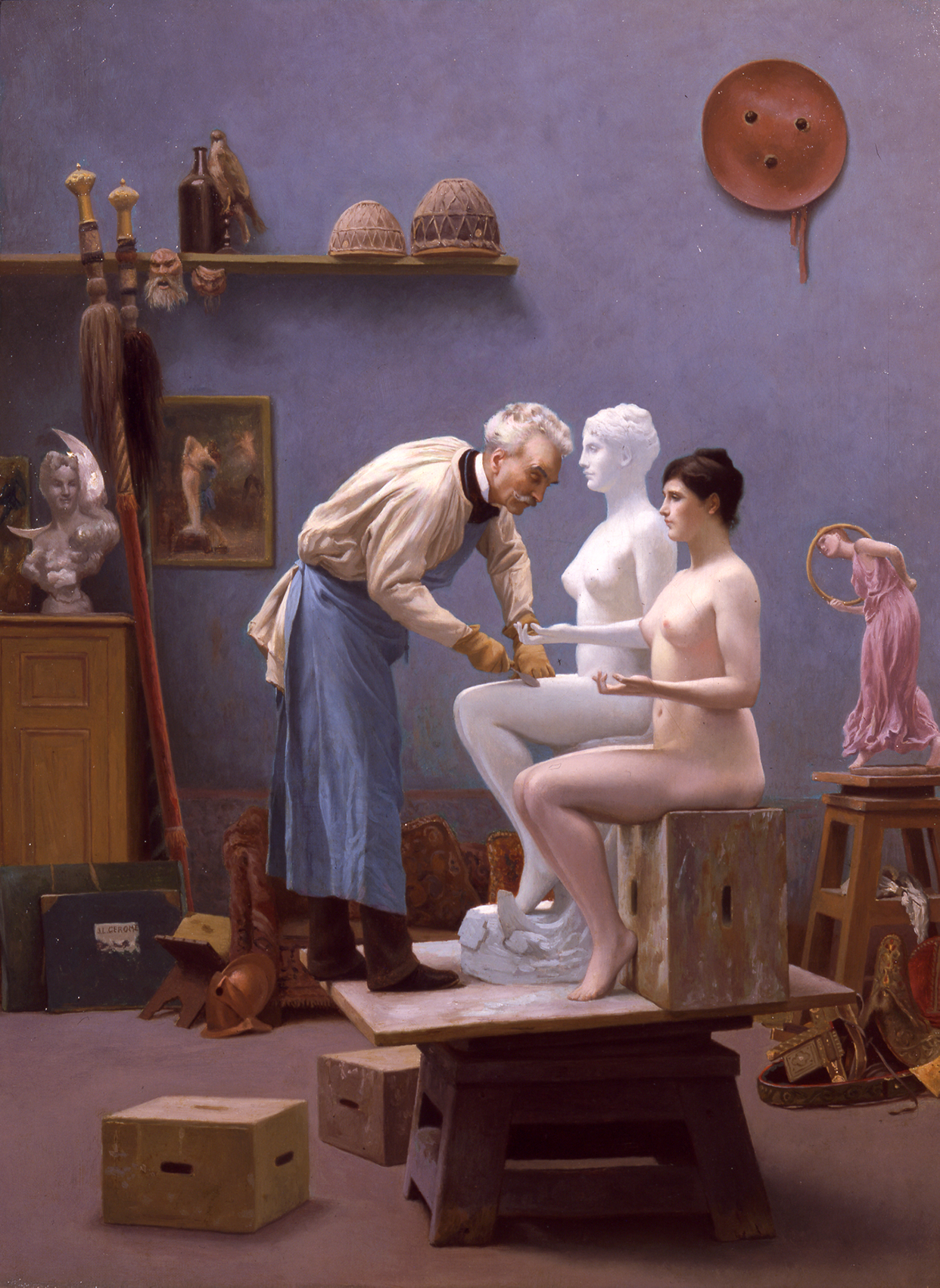
The Artist and His Model (1895) by Jean-Léon Gérôme

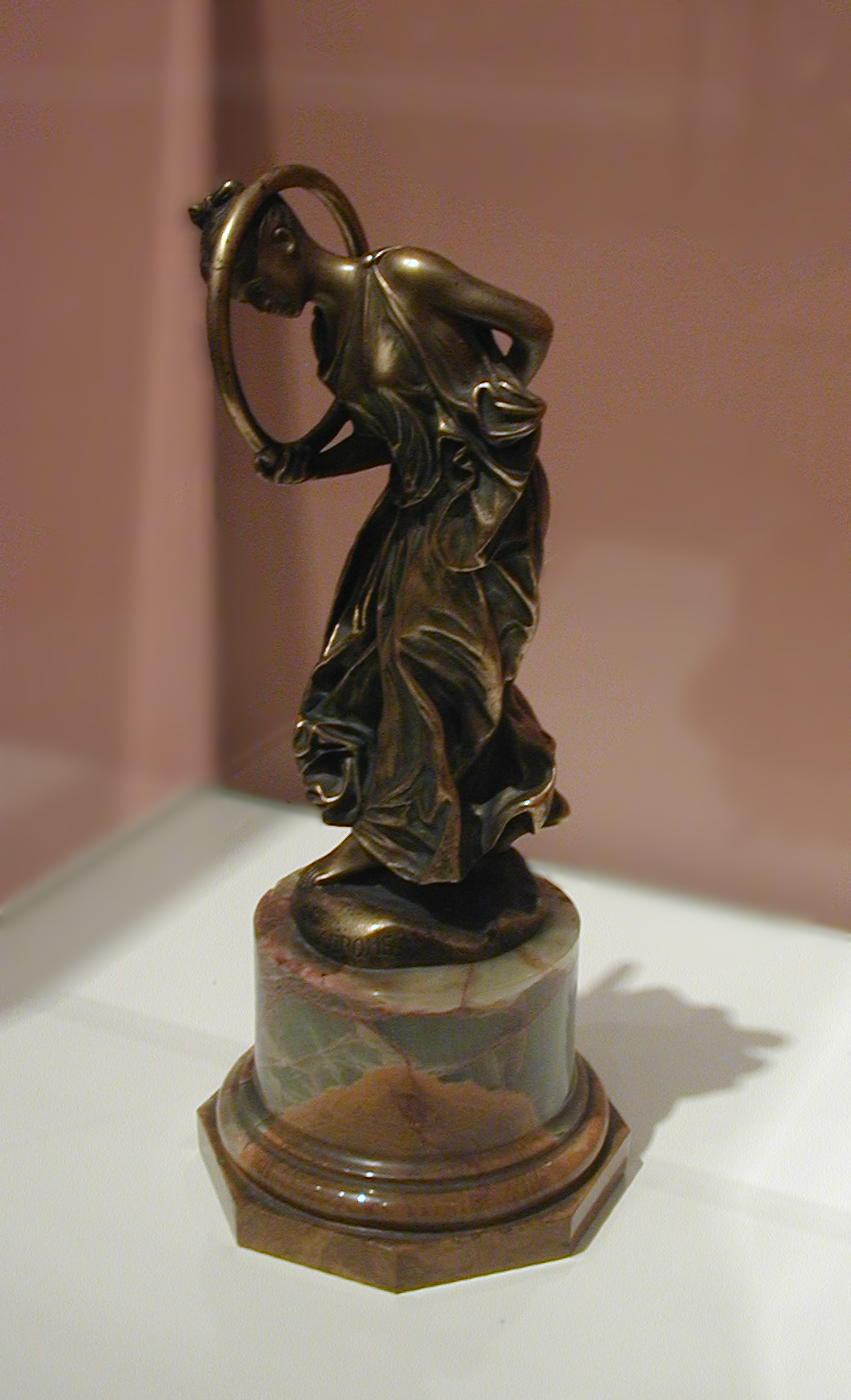
Hoop Dancer (before 1895) by Jean-Léon Gérôme; seen in his painting The Artist and His Model

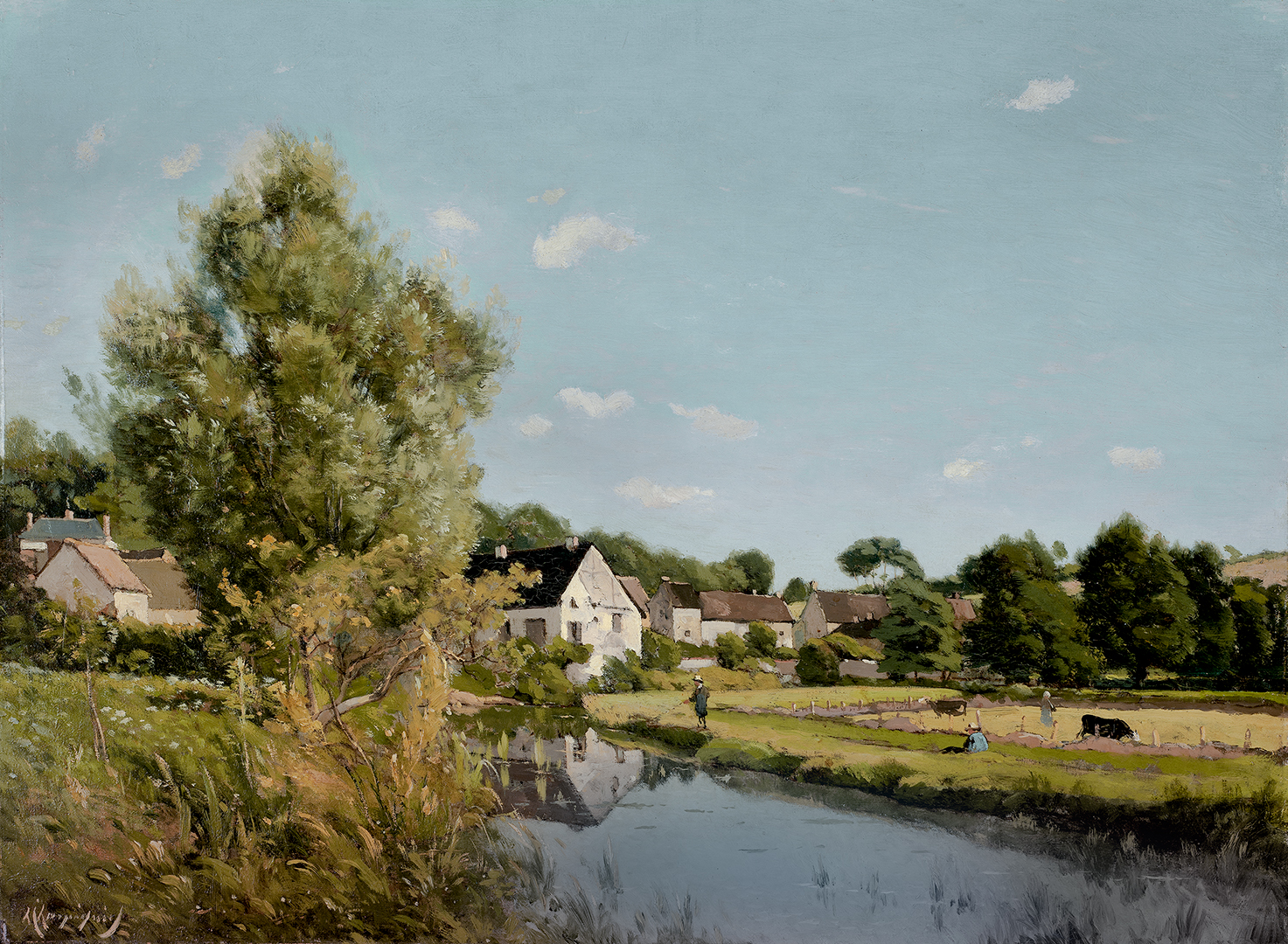
The Mill Stream (1870-1900) by Henri-Joseph Harpignies

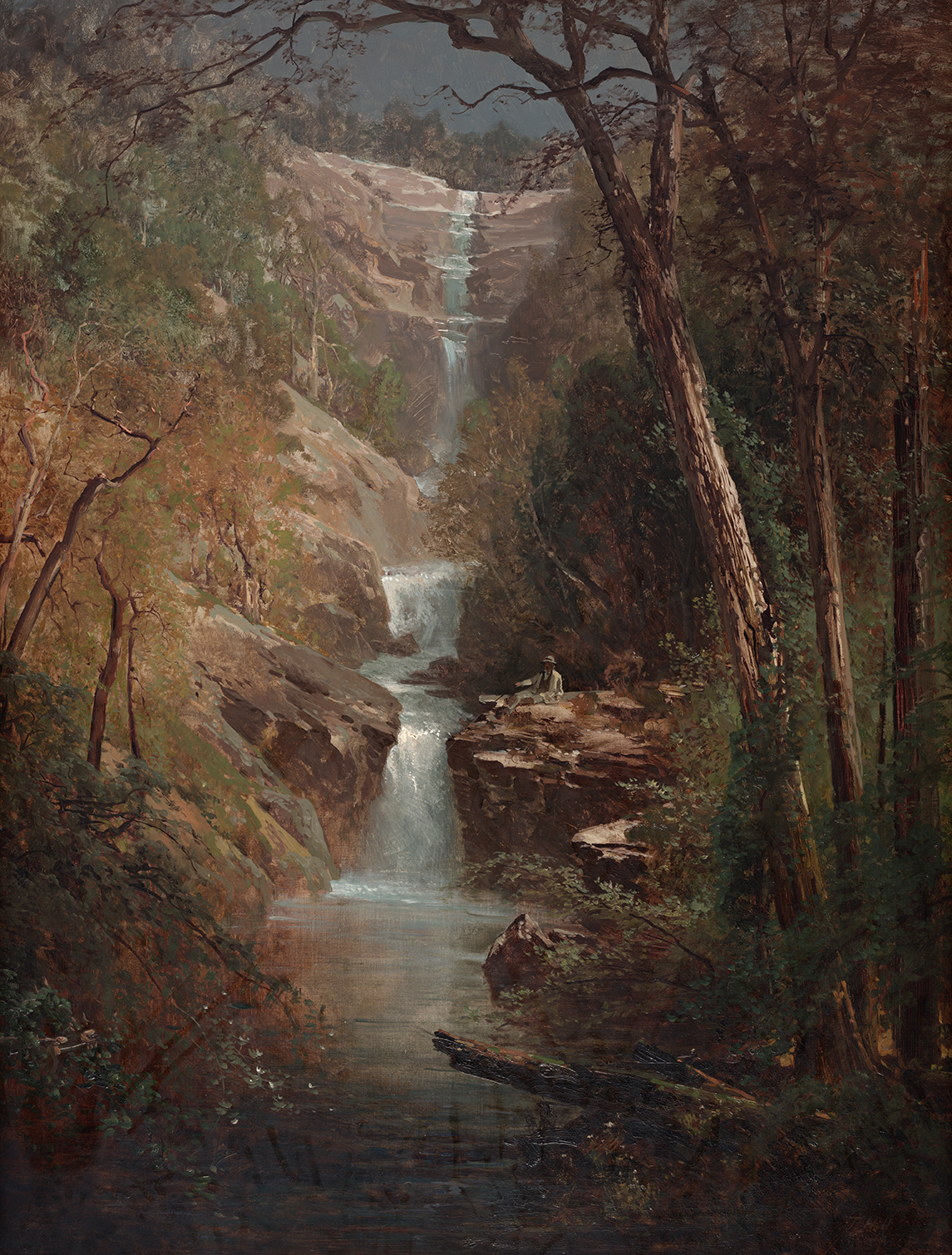
Untitled (1877) by Thomas Hill

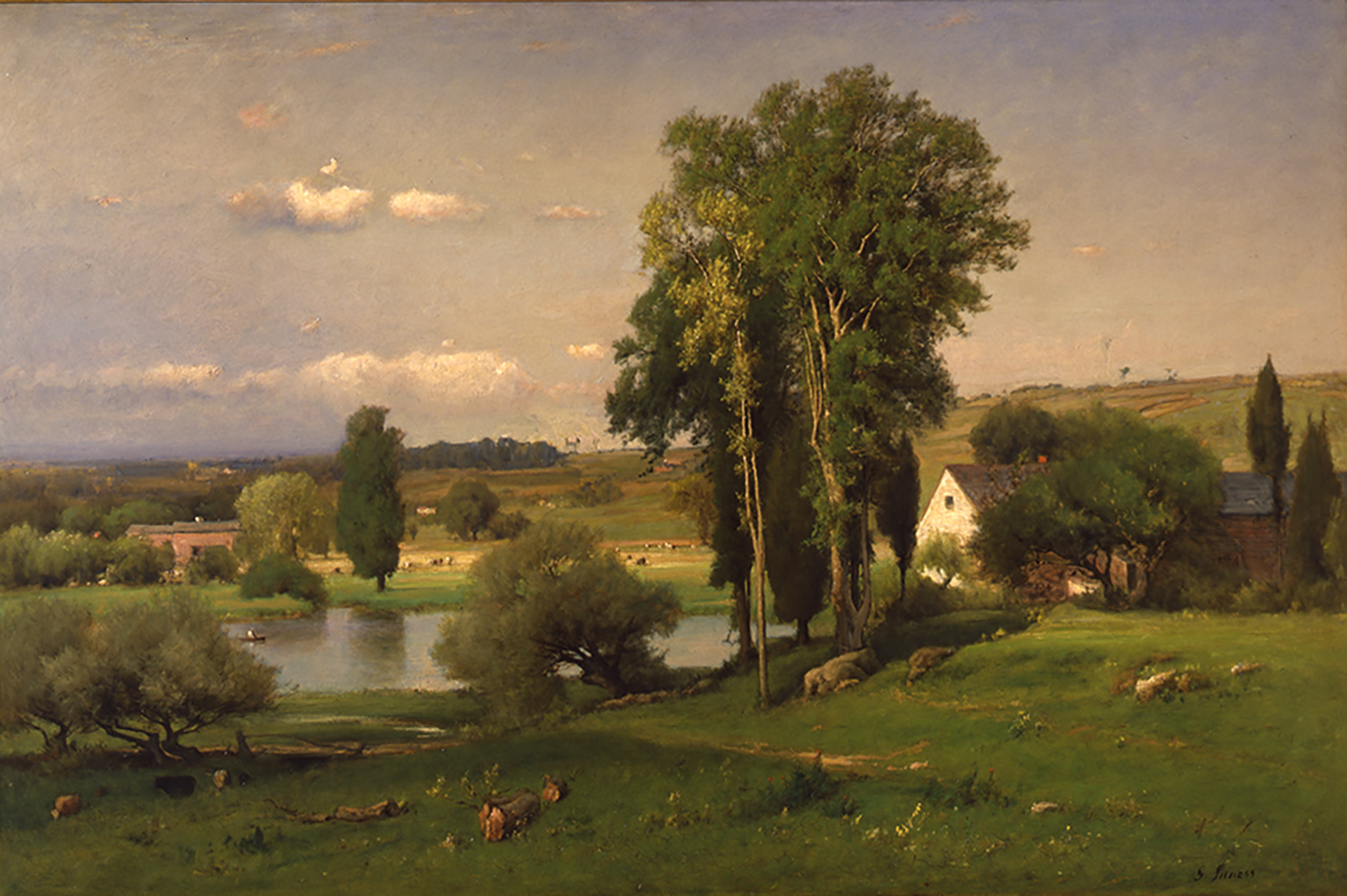
Old Homestead (1877) by George Inness

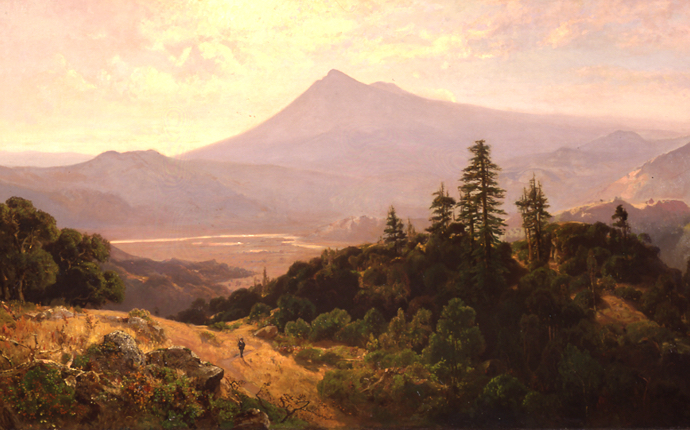
Mount Tamalpais (1879) by William Keith

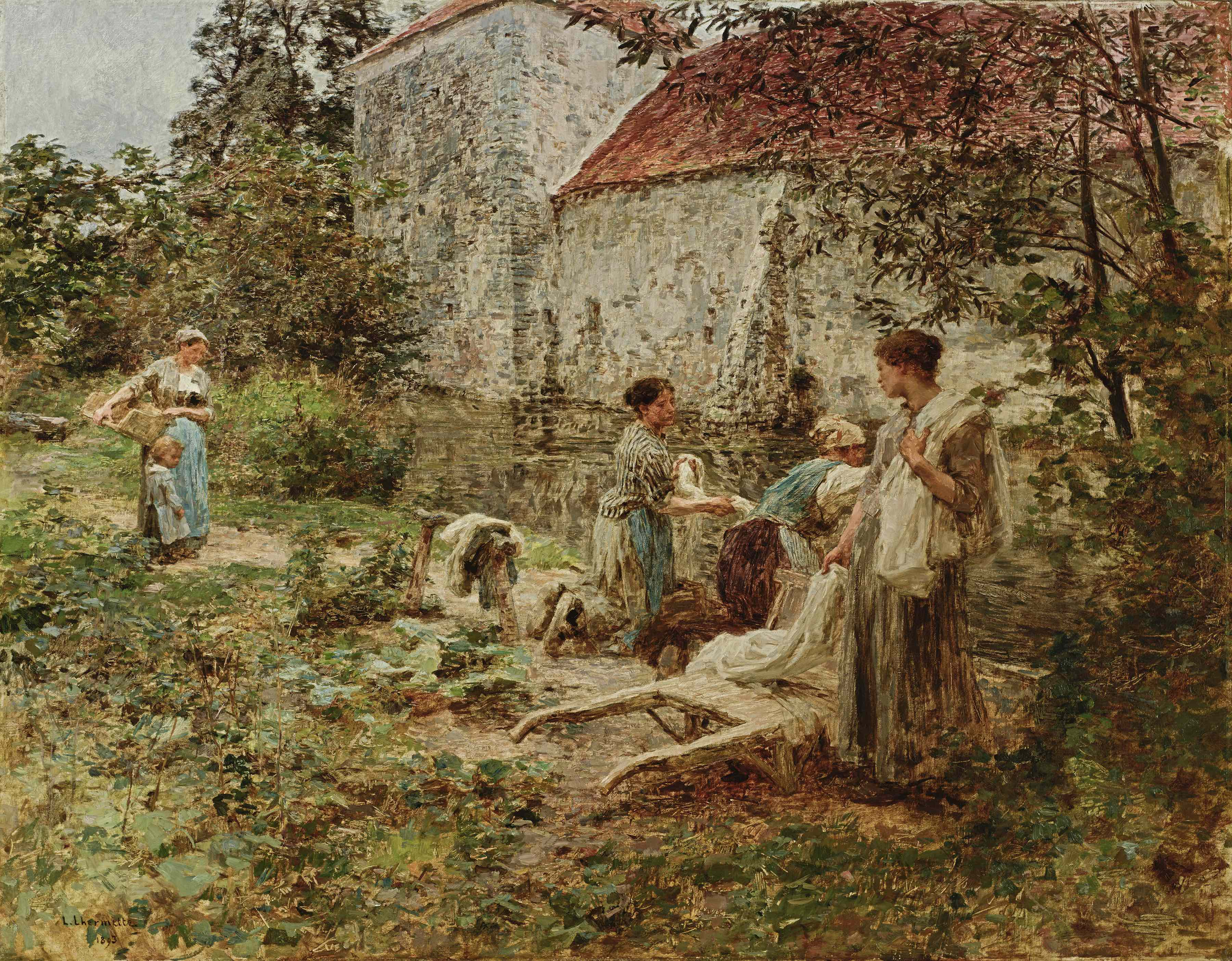
The Moated Wall (1893) by Léon Augustin Lhermitte

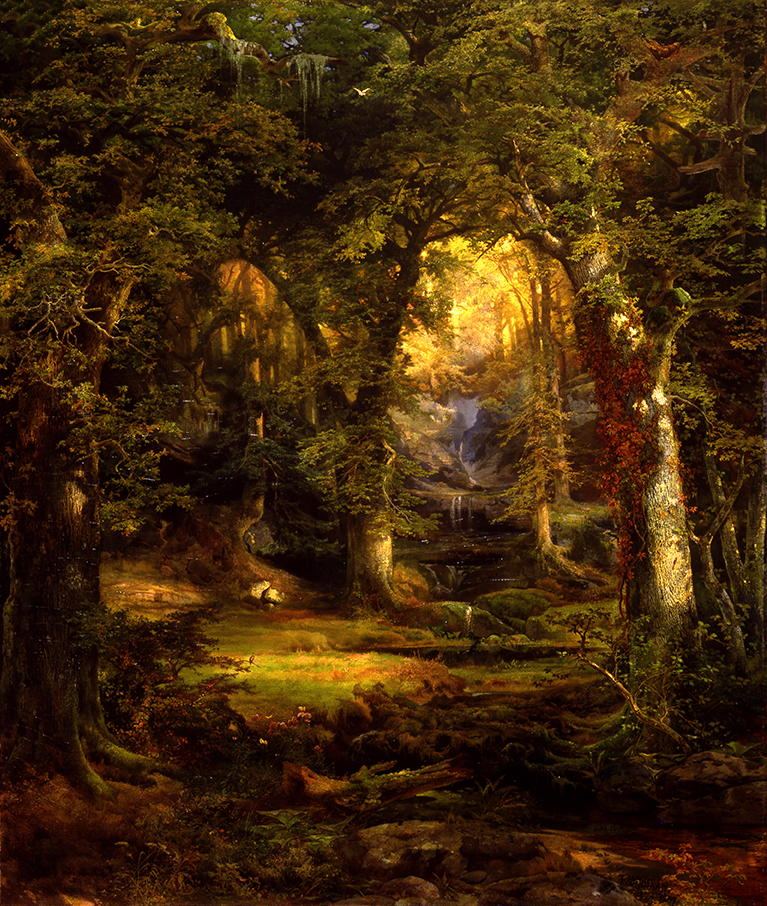
Woodland Temple (1867) by Thomas Moran

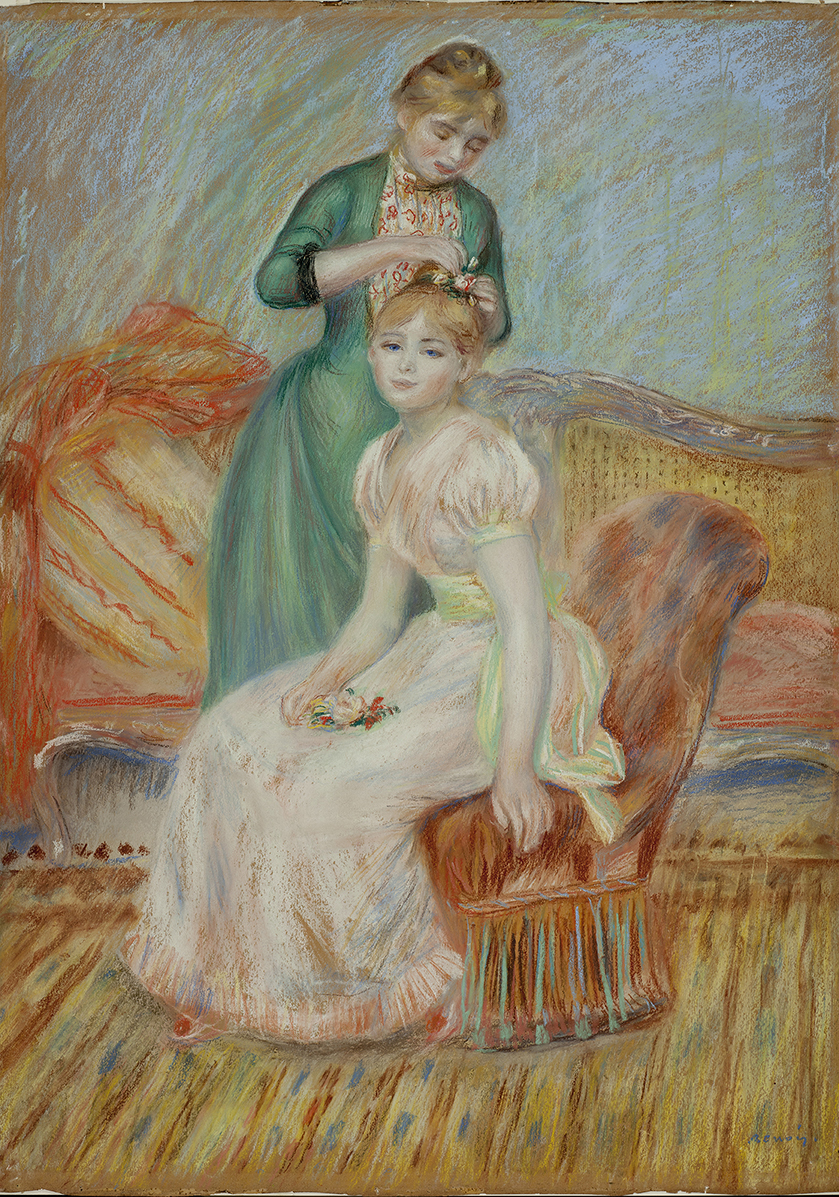
La Toilette (1889) by Pierre-Auguste Renoir

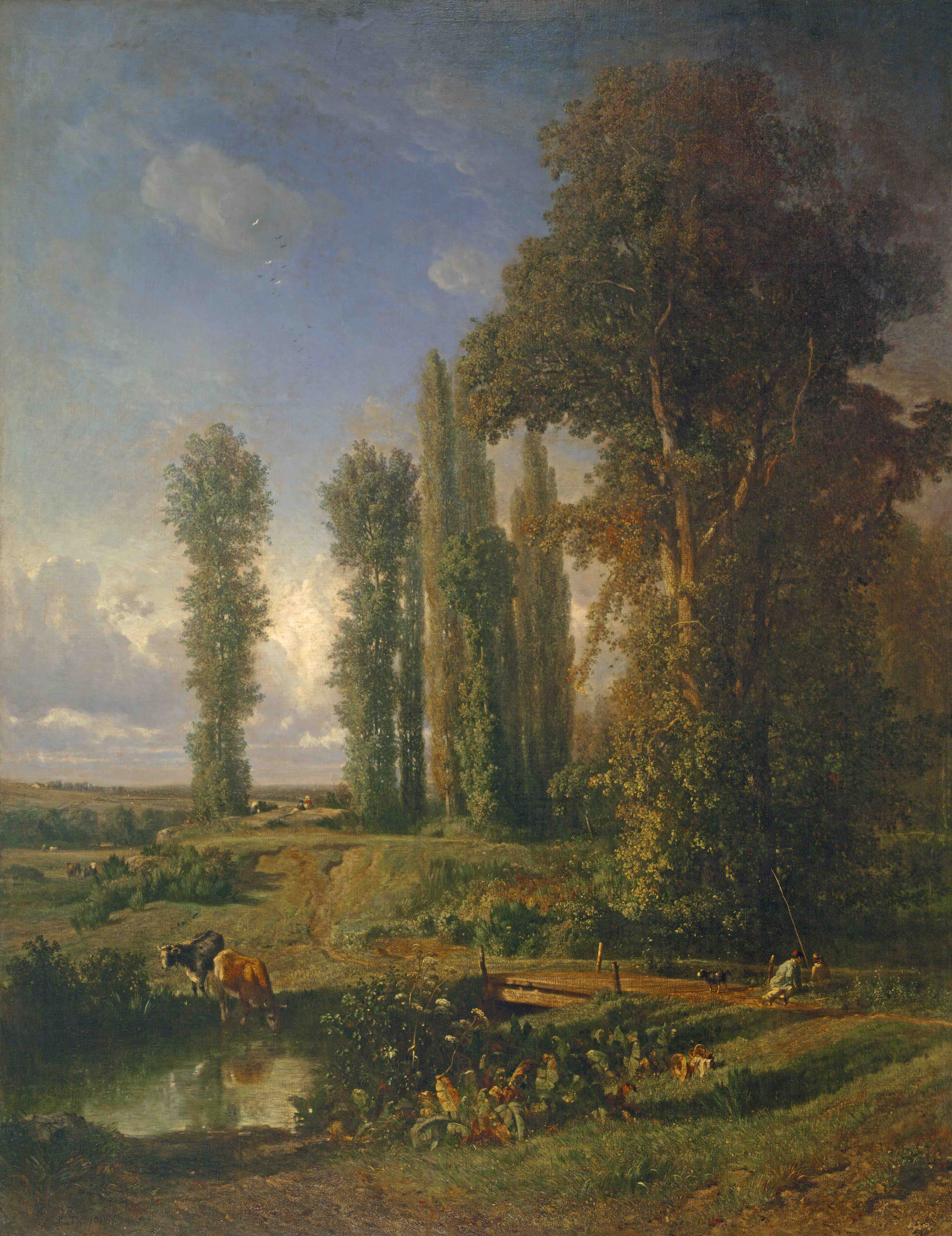
A Last Summer Day, Normandy (1840-1855) by Constant Troyon

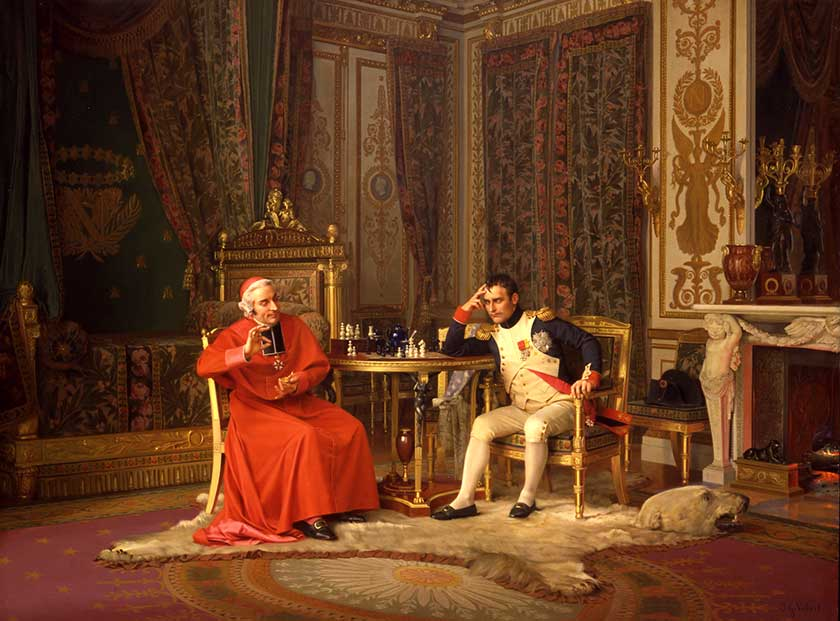
Check (undated) by Jehan Georges Vibert

Sophistication (1908) by Harry Watrous

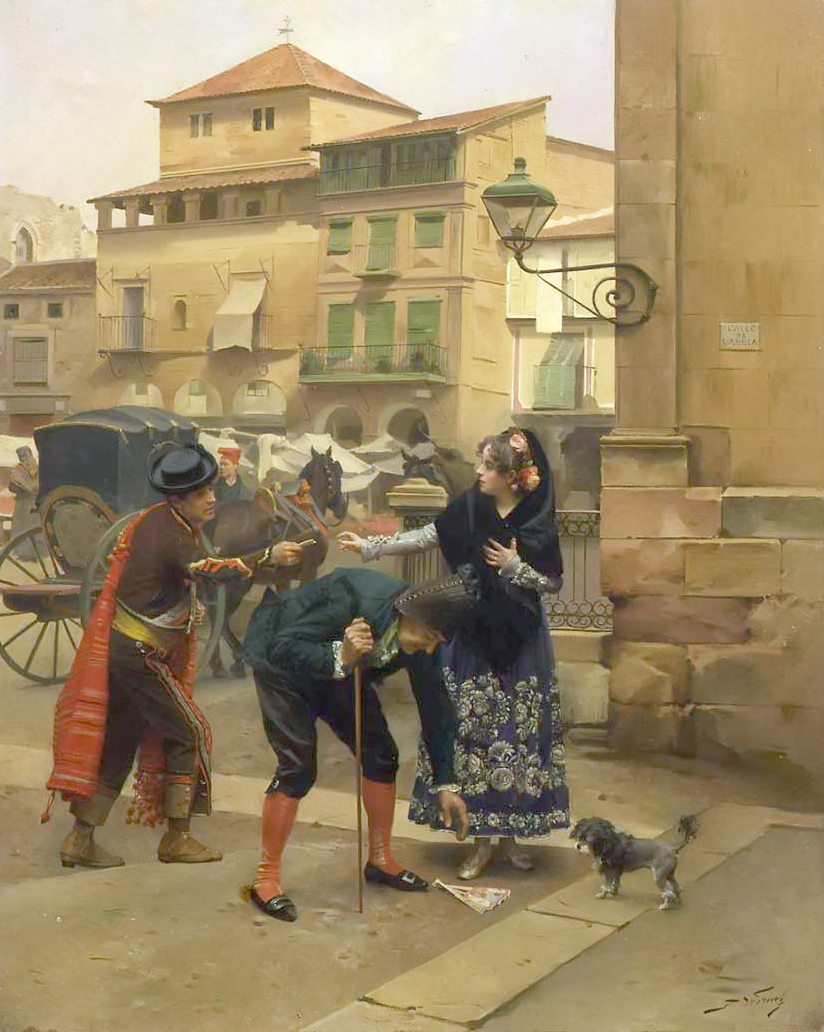
The Furtive Message (after 1877) by Jules Worms

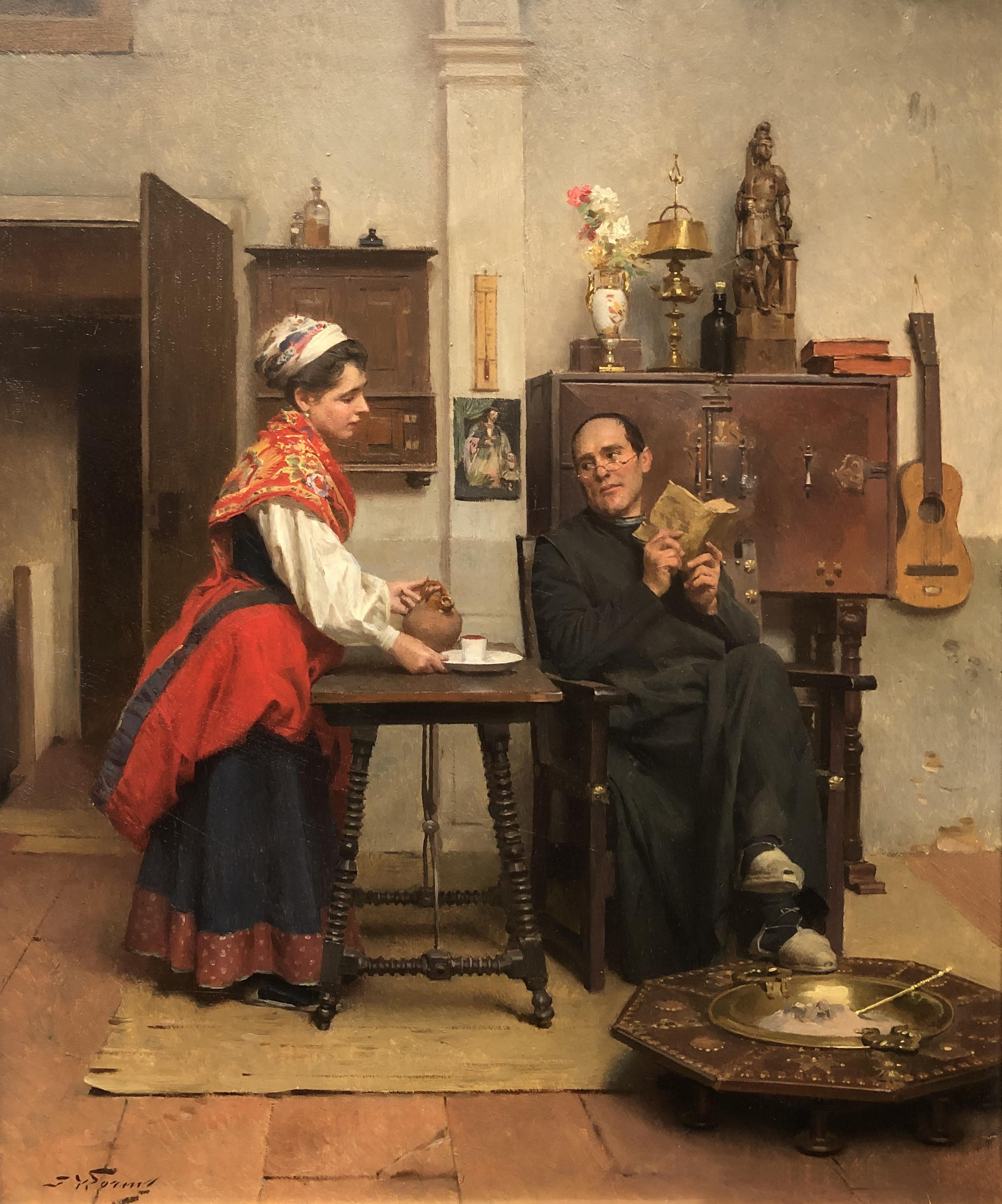
The Red Shawl (undated) by Jules Worms
