= Emma LeDoux =

American murderer (1875–1941)

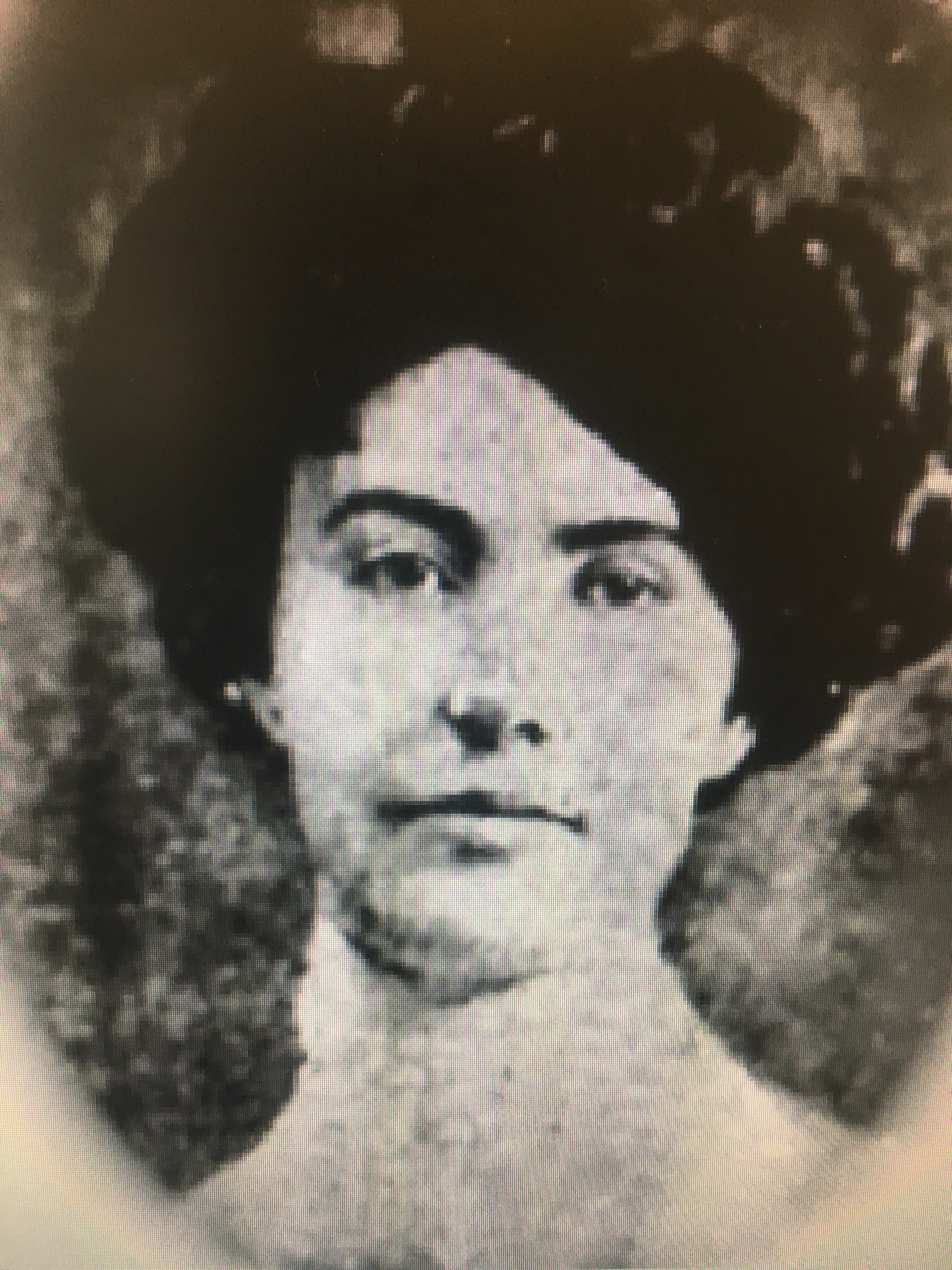
- Emma Theresa Cole LeDoux in 1899
- Born: Emma Theresa Cole LeDoux; September 10, 1875; Pine Grove, California
- Died: July 6, 1941 (aged 65); Tehachapi, California, U.S.
- Other name: The Trunk Murder
- Known for: The Trunk Murder
- Criminal charges: Murder

Emma LeDoux (September 10, 1875 - July 6, 1941) was the first woman sentenced to death in the State of California. She had been convicted of murdering Albert McVicar, her third husband, whom she had poisoned and stuffed into a steamer trunk. She had the trunk delivered to a Stockton railway station on March 24, 1906.

Upon appeal, she was granted a retrial. She pleaded guilty and was sentenced to life imprisonment.

== Early life ==
She was born Emma Theresa Cole on September 10, 1875, in Grove, California; her parents were Thomas Jefferson Cole from Ione, California, and Mary Ann Gardner. The family moved to Oregon when Emma was around three years old, staying there about a decade. They returned to Amador County in 1888.

== Marriages ==
At age 16 (in 1892 or 1893), Cole married but the couple divorced in 1898. Subsequently, she married William Williams, a miner, who died of gastroenteritis in 1902.

Within a few months, she married a third time, to Albert McVicar. While McVicar was enamored with his wife, she did not feel the same about him. They separated though did not divorce.

In August 1905, she married Jean LeDoux without revealing she was still married to her third husband, McVicar, thus she committed bigamy.

== Trunk murder of 1906 ==
On March 24, 1906, the body of Albert McVicar, Emma's third husband, was found in a steamer trunk that was left on the platform of the Stockton Train Depot. LeDoux had purchased the trunk earlier at a store in Stockton, while she and Albert were staying at lodgings in town. She was found to have poisoned Albert with morphine, physically assaulted him, and stuffed him into the trunk while he was still alive. He died in the trunk.

She hired someone to take the trunk to the train depot and gave orders to have it shipped to Jamestown, California, but she failed to put the tag on the trunk before she took a train to San Francisco. The trunk remained on the platform all day. The baggage master summoned the authorities when the trunk began to have an odor. Police obtained a warrant; the trunk was opened, revealing McVicar's body.

Sheriff Sibley from Stockton, along with Constable John Whelehan, of Arlington, searched for LeDoux, apprehending her at the Arlington Hotel in Arlington, California. When the constable approached her, LeDoux said, “I know what you want with me, and I will go with you.”

LeDoux was a bigamist, as she was married to both McVicar and Jean LeDoux of Sutter Creek at the same time. She had married McVicar three months after her second husband, William S. Williams died under suspicious circumstances in Cochise County, Arizona. Nitric acid poisoning was suspected in that death. She was the beneficiary of Williams's life insurance policy, gaining at least $4,000 upon his death.

The trial of Emma LeDoux was postponed temporarily because of the 1906 San Francisco earthquake. She was convicted of first degree murder, and was the first woman to be sentenced to death in the State of California. Her hanging was scheduled for October 19 at San Quentin Prison; however, she received a stay of execution, and remained in jail until 1909.

In 1910, a new trial was granted. As she was in poor health, she decided to plead guilty to lesser charges. She was sentenced to life imprisonment and was transferred to San Quentin. She served 10 years before being paroled in 1920. On April 21, 1931, she was returned to prison for parole violations, and was held there for the rest of her life.

She died on July 6, 1941. She is buried in the Union Cemetery in Bakersfield, California.

== In popular culture ==
The steamer trunk used by LeDoux in the murder of Albert McVicar is on display at the Haggin Museum in Stockton.
