= Verite =

Verite may refer to:

- Vérité (born 1990), American pop singer
- Verité Research, an independent interdisciplinary think tank
- Verite Film Festival (Kashmir), an Indian film festival
- Verite (Dune), a fictional drug from Frank Herbert's Dune novel series
- Cinéma vérité, a style of documentary filmmaking
- Radio Verite, a New Jersey Haitian radio station
- Vérité, a Haitian political party

== See also ==
- La Vérité (disambiguation)
- Cinéma vérité (disambiguation)
