= La Vérité =

La Vérité (French for 'the truth') may refer to:

== Newspapers ==
- La Vérité (Shanghai), French language radical socialist weekly newspaper published from Shanghai 1931
- La Vérité, antisemitic journal of Jules-Paul Tardivel 1881
- La Vérité (Trotskyist journal)
- La Vérité (Madagascar), Malagasy newspaper

== Music ==
- La Verité (Classix Nouveaux album), 1992
- La Vérité (Niagara album), 1992
- La Vérité, a 1968 album and song by Guy Béart
- Vérité, American singer-songwriter

== Other uses ==
- La Vérité (film), a 1960 film by Henri-Georges Clouzot
- The Truth (La Vérité), a 2019 film by Hirokazu Kore-eda
- La Vérité sortant du puits (Truth Coming Out of Her Well), a painting by Jean-Léon Gérôme
- La Vérité, a painting by Jules Joseph Lefebvre
- La Verite (horse), Swedish born trotter (2017–2022)
