= Truth Coming Out of Her Well =

1896 painting by Jean-Léon Gérôme

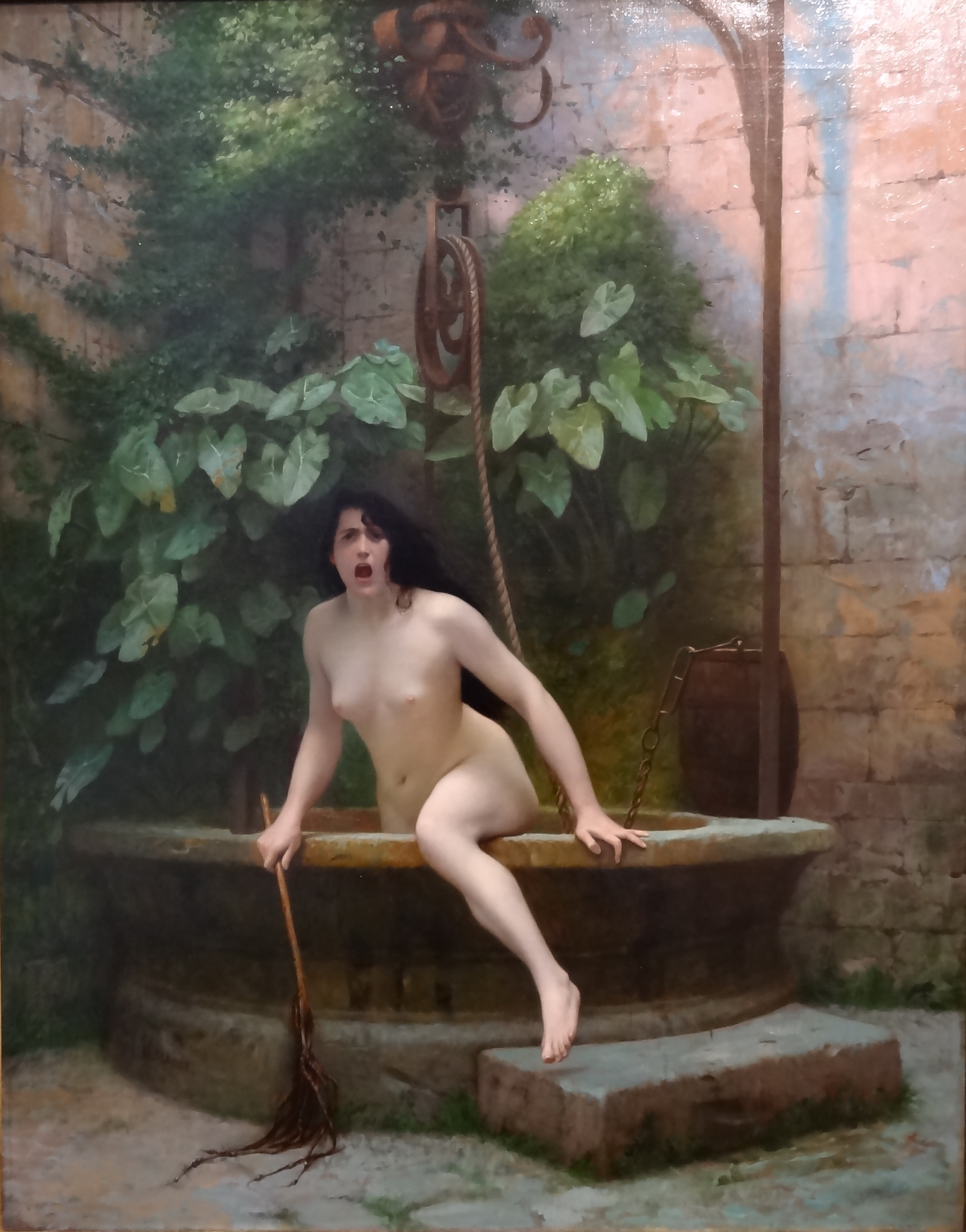
- Artist: Jean-Léon Gérôme
- Year: 1896
- Medium: Oil on canvas
- Dimensions: 91 cm × 72 cm (36 in × 28 in)
- Location: Anne de Beaujeu Museum; Moulins

La Vérité sortant du puits armée de son martinet pour châtier l'humanité (English: Truth coming from the well armed with her whip to chastise humanity) is an 1896 painting by the French artist Jean-Léon Gérôme.

== Overview ==
Starting in the mid-1890s, during the final decade of his life, Gérôme made at least four paintings personifying Truth as a nude woman, either thrown into, at the bottom of, or emerging from a well.

The imagery arises from a translation of an aphorism of the philosopher Democritus, "Of truth we know nothing, for truth is in a well". (Greek ἐτεῇ δὲ οὐδὲν ἴδμεν: ἐν βυθῷ γὰρ ἡ ἀλήθεια, eteêi dè oudèn ídmen: en buthô gàr hē alḗtheia, [literally] "in reality we know nothing; for the truth is in an abyss".) The nudity of the model may arise from the expression la vérité nue, "the naked truth".

An earlier painting by Jules-Arsène Garnier, who studied under Gérôme, depicted the emergence of a nude woman from a well, and a crowd running away from her. It was shown at the Paris Salon of 1883 under the title La Vérité. The Salon catalogue entry for the work included an epigram credited to a fable by Florian: "La Vérité toute nue sortit un jour de son puits; chacun s’enfuyait à sa vue." (The naked Truth one day came out of her well; everyone fled at the sight of her). An even earlier painting by Paul Baudry, La Vérité (c. 1879), depicted naked Truth sitting placidly upon a well, holding a mirror and attended by a nude infant.

At the Paris Salon of 1895, Gérôme showed a painting entitled Mendacibus et histrionibus occisa in puteo jacet alma Veritas (English: The nurturer Truth lies in a well, having been killed by liars and actors), in which he depicted "naked Truth killed by Falsehood, her body flung into a well and the mirror after her, from which flashes of light are cast as it lightens the dark abyss". At the next Salon in 1896, Gérôme showed Truth Coming Out of Her Well.

It has been assumed that both paintings (like a similar, later work by Édouard Debat-Ponsan) were comments on the Dreyfus affair, but art historian Bernard Tillier argues that Gérôme's images of Truth and the well were part of his ongoing diatribe against Impressionism.

In a preface for Émile Bayard's Le Nu Esthétique published in 1902, Gérôme uses the metaphor of Truth and the well to characterize the profound and irreversible influence of photography:

La photographie est un art. La photographie force les artistes à se dépouiller de la vieille routine et à oublier les vieilles formules. Elle nous a ouvert les yeux et forcé à regarder ce qu'auparavant nous n'avions jamais vu, service considérable et inappréciable qu'elle a rendu à l'Art. C'est grâce à elle que la vérité est enfin sortie de son puits. Elle n'y rentrera plus.

Translation:

Photography is an art. It forces artists to discard their old routine and forget their old formulas. It has opened our eyes and forced us to see that which previously we have not seen; a great and inexpressible service for Art. It is thanks to photography that Truth has finally come out of her well. She will never go back.

Gérôme kept at least one of the paintings. When he died in 1904, "the maid found him dead in the little room next to his atelier, slumped in front of a portrait of Rembrandt and at the foot of his own painting, Truth"—but the source for this anecdote, the biographer Charles Moreau-Vauthier, does not specify which painting of Truth.

Since 1978, Truth Coming Out of Her Well has been part of the permanent exhibition at the Anne de Beaujeu Museum in Moulins, France. In 2012, after the painting traveled to Los Angeles, Paris and Madrid, the museum featured the exhibition La vérité est au musée ("Truth is at the Museum"), which collected numerous drawings, sketches, and variants made by Gérôme, and by other artists, relating to the painting and its theme. The multiple interpretations of the painting's enigmatic meaning prompted one of the museum's curators to say, "C'est notre Joconde à nous." ("This is our Mona Lisa.")

== Gallery (chronological) ==
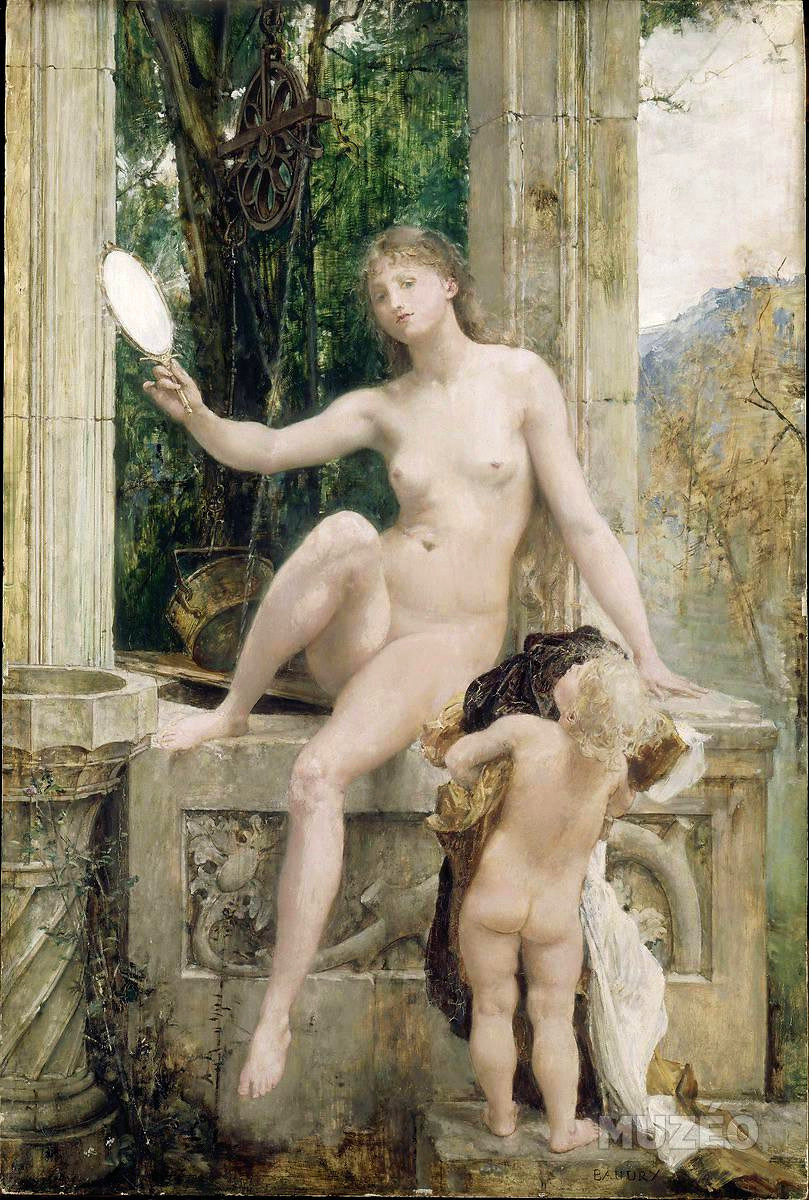
La Vérité (c. 1879) by Paul Baudry, Musée d'Orsay

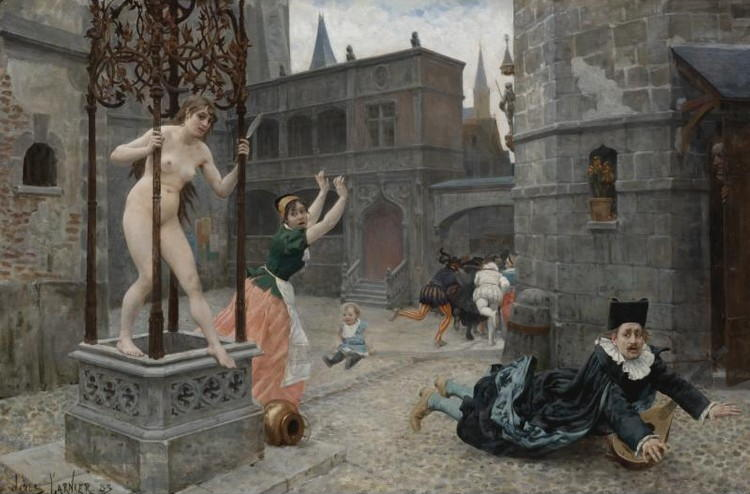
La Vérité (1883) by Jules-Arsène Garnier, private collection

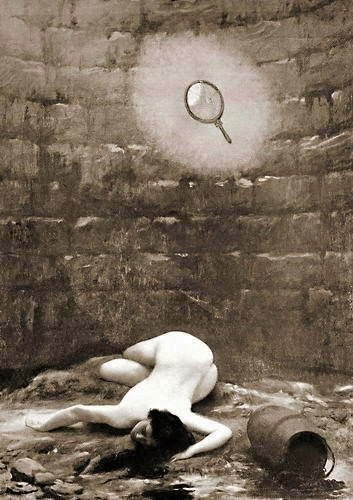
Mendacibus et histrionibus occisa in puteo jacet alma Veritas (The nurturer Truth lies in a well, having been killed by liars and actors, 1895) by Jean-Léon Gérôme

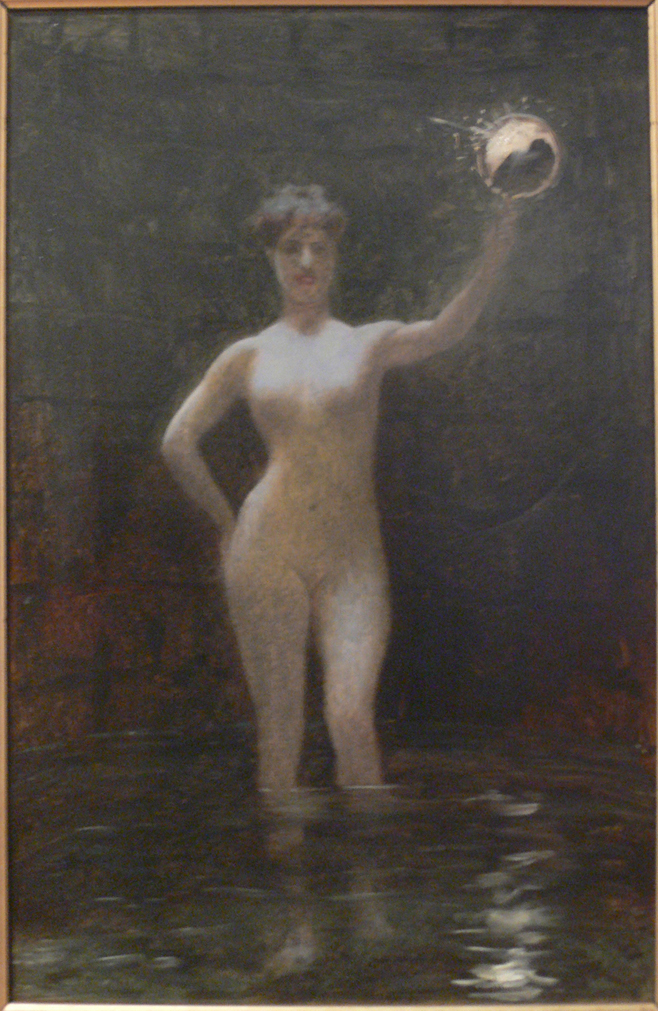
Truth at the Bottom of a Well (study, 1895) by Jean-Léon Gérôme, Musée Georges-Garret

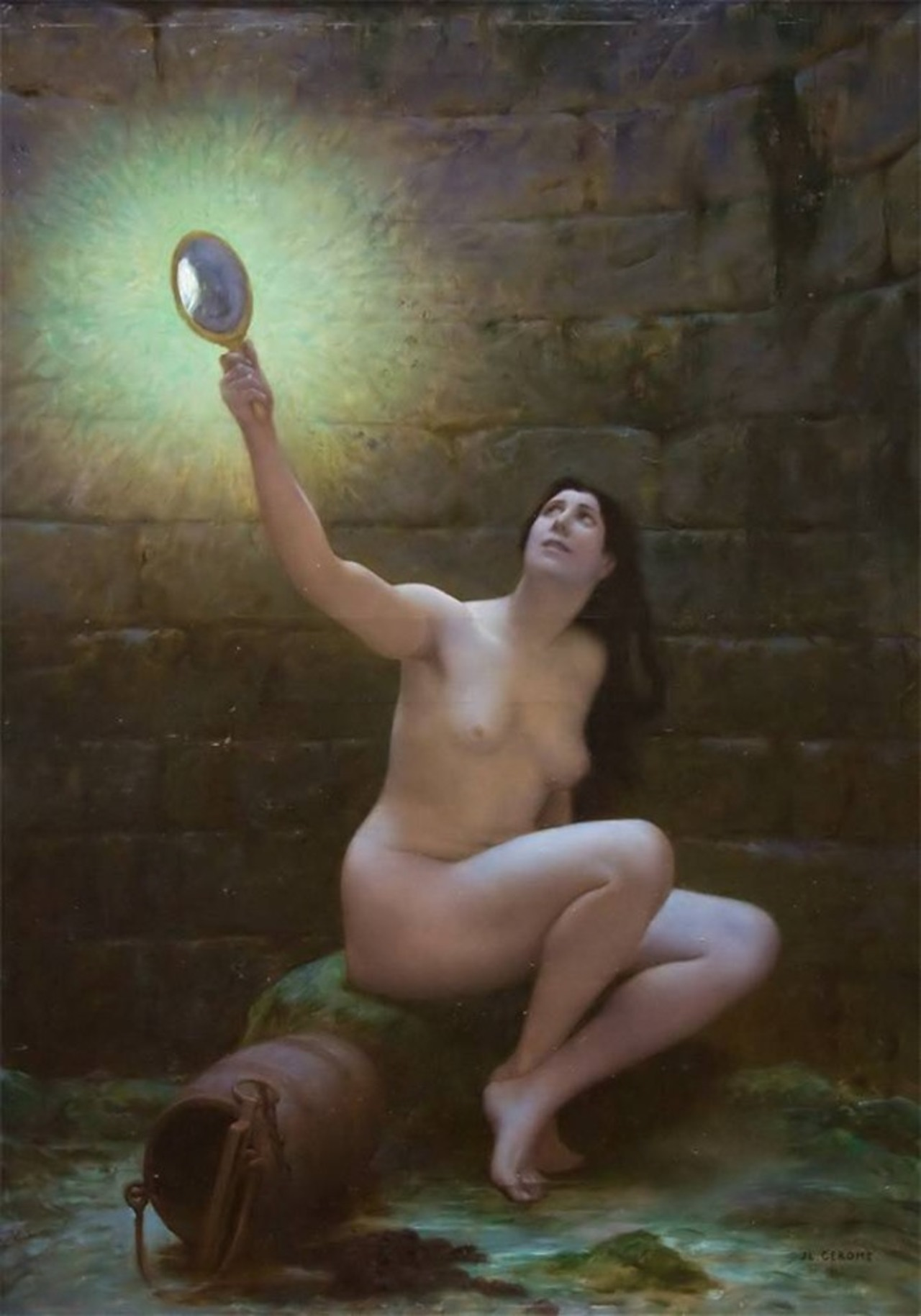
Truth is at the Bottom of the Well (1895) by Jean-Léon Gérôme, Musée des Beaux-Arts de Lyon

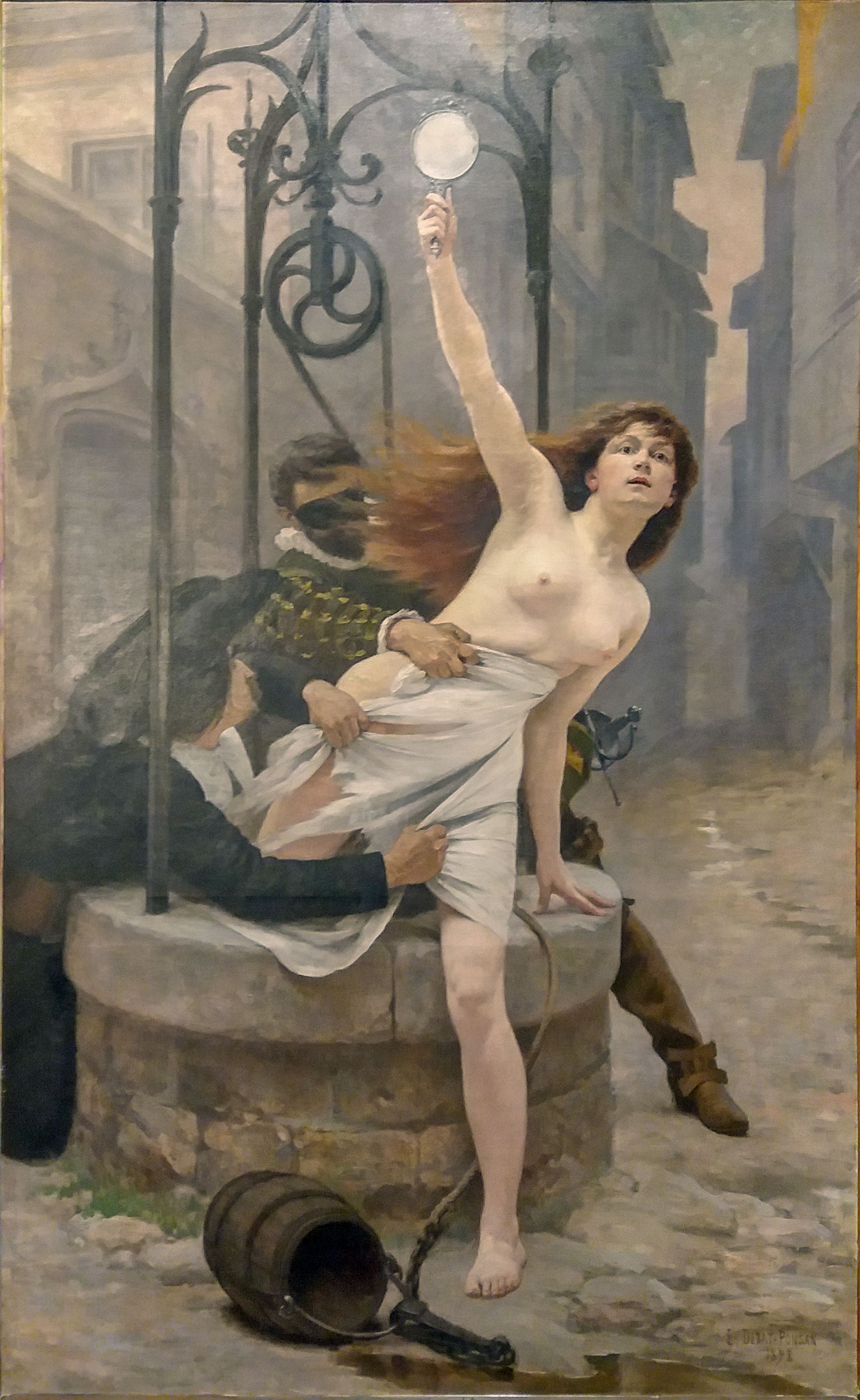
La Vérité sortant du Puits (1898) by Édouard Debat-Ponsan, Musée de l'Hôtel de Ville, Amboise

== See also ==
- Dreyfus affair
- Veritas
- The Truth (Lefebvre)
