= Veritas =

Goddess of truth in Roman mythology

- Goddess of truth
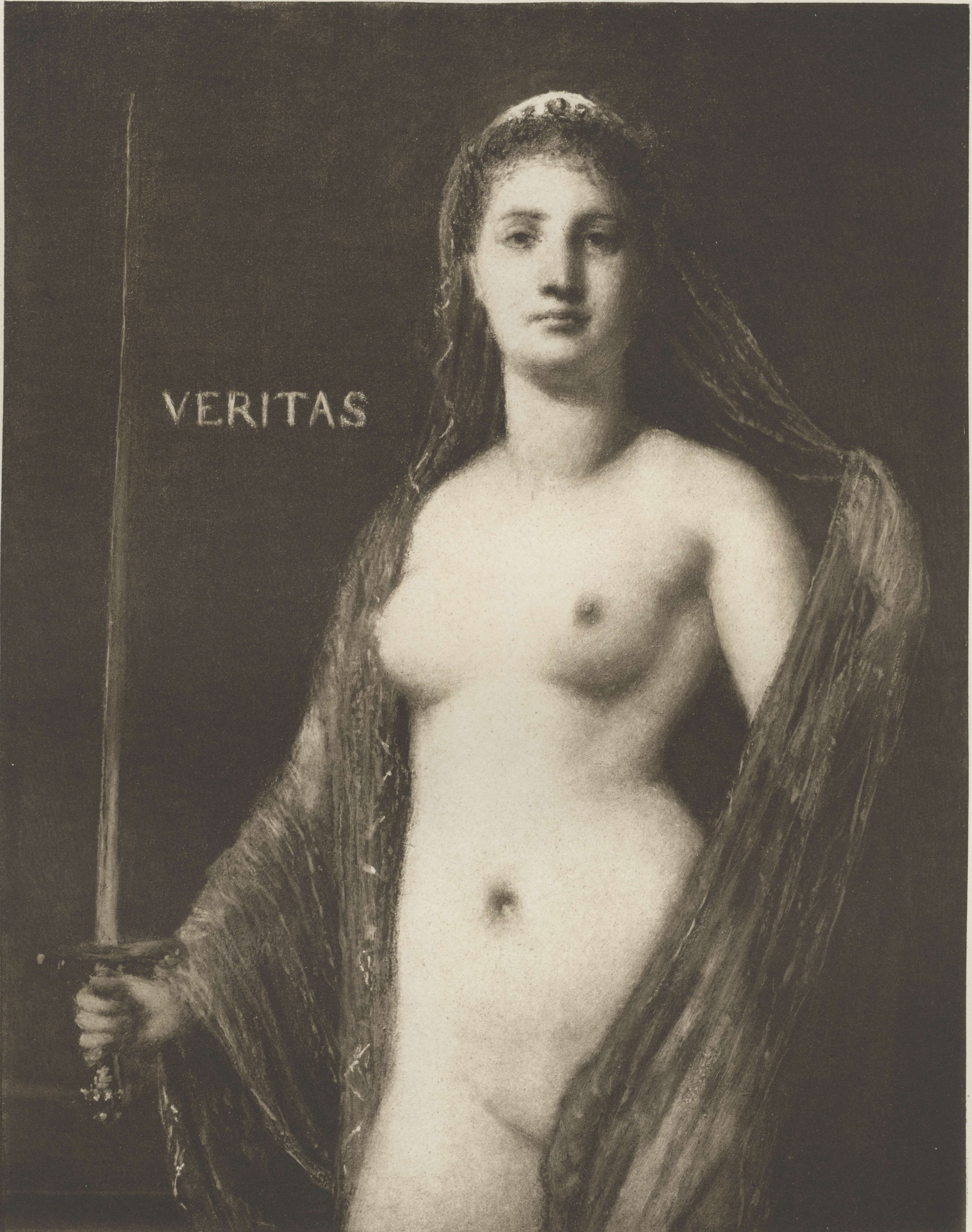
- Veritas, depicted by Arnold Böcklin
- Symbols: nudity
- Gender: female
- Offspring: Virtus

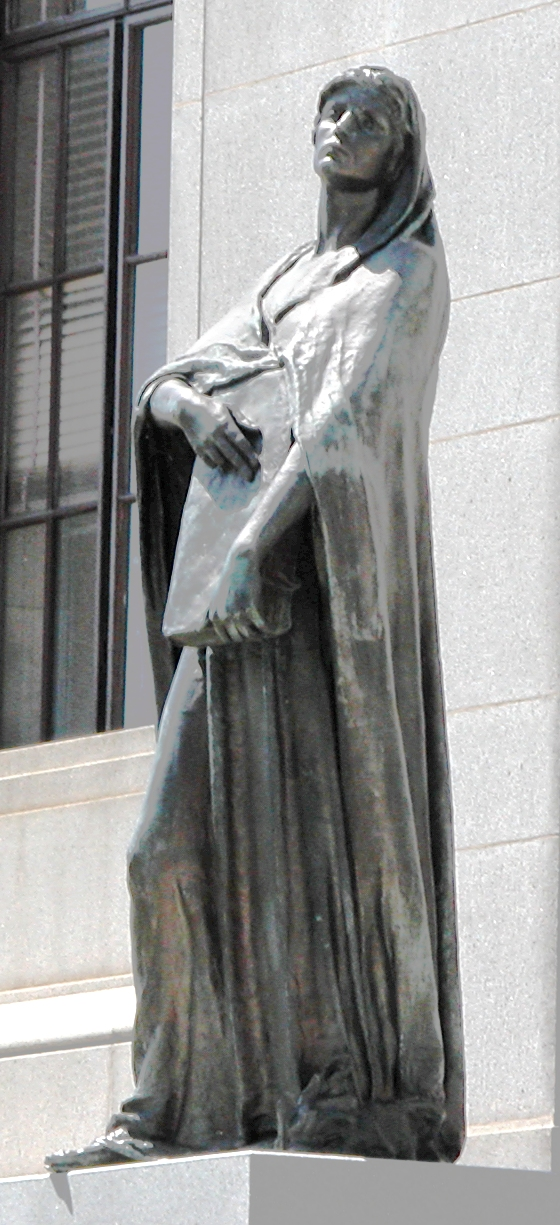
Statue of Veritas outside the Supreme Court of Canada

In Roman mythology, Veritas (Classical Latin: [ˈweː.rɪ.t̪aːs]), meaning Truth, is the Goddess of Truth, a daughter of Saturn (called Cronus by the Greeks, the Titan of Time, perhaps first by Plutarch) and the mother of Virtus. She is also sometimes considered the daughter of Jupiter (called Zeus by the Greeks), or a creation of Prometheus. The elusive goddess is said to have hidden in the bottom of a holy well. She is depicted both as a virgin dressed in white and as the "naked truth" (nuda veritas) holding a hand mirror. The equivalent Greek goddess is Aletheia (Ancient Greek: Ἀλήθεια).

Veritas was the Roman virtue of truthfulness, which was considered one of the main virtues any good Roman should possess. The German philosopher Martin Heidegger argues that the truth represented by aletheia (which essentially means "unconcealment") is different from that represented by veritas, which is linked to a Roman understanding of rightness and finally to a Nietzschean sense of justice and a will to power.

In Western culture, the word may also serve as a motto.

== Mottos ==
This Latin word veritas now appears in the mottos of many colleges, universities and other organizations. It is typically capitalized in mottoes (as Veritas) for being an ideal like Truth, Kindness and Beauty.

Veritas is the motto of:

- Harvard University
- Hutchesons' Grammar School
- Drake University
- Knox College (Illinois)
- Bilkent University
- the Dominican Order of the Roman Catholic Church
  - Providence College and Molloy College, run by the Dominicans
- the Naval Criminal Investigative Service
- Loyola College, Ibadan
- St Dominic's Sixth Form College

Additionally, the word appears in mottoes that are phrases or lists, e.g.:

- Veritas et Utilitas: the University of Western Ontario in London, Ontario
- Honor et Veritas: the Buckley School of the City of New York
- Veritas, Probitas, Iustitia: the University of Indonesia
- Veritas Nobis Lumen: the University of Cape Coast in Ghana
- Libertas, Justitia, Veritas ("Liberty, Justice, Truth"): Korea University in Seoul
- Artes, Scientia, Veritas: the University of Michigan
- Veritas vos liberabit (The Truth Will Set You Free): The Johns Hopkins University; and St Thomas' College (Autonomous), Thrissur, the first Catholic college in Kerala
- Veritas Liberabit Vos: Doshisha University in Kyoto, Japan
- Verbum Tuum Veritas ("Your Word is Truth"): Monkton Combe School.
- Lux et Veritas ("Light and Truth"): Indiana University and Yale University.
- Vox Veritas Vita ("Speak the Truth as a way of Life"): California State University
- Veritas Curat ("Truth Cures"): the Jawaharlal Institute of Postgraduate Medical Education and Research, a medical school in Puducherry, India.
- Veritas Lux Mea ("Truth is my light"): in the logo of Seoul National University, Korea
- Veritas, Unitas, Caritas ("Truth, Unity, Love"): Villanova University
- Gratiae veritas naturae: Uppsala University in Sweden
- Lux et Veritas Floreant ("Let Light and Truth Flourish"): The University of Winnipeg

Caldwell College in Caldwell, New Jersey issues a "Veritas Award" each year in honor of the Dominican Sisters who founded and administer the college.

Howard University, in Washington, D.C., goes by the motto Veritas et Utilitas, translated to "Truth and Service", which is also a motto "Truth-Service" of Payap University, Thailand.

The American communications company Verizon derives its name from the combination of the words veritas and horizon - chosen from 8,500 candidates with $300 million spent on marketing the new brand.

== See also ==
- 490 Veritas – Main-belt asteroid
- In vino veritas – Latin phrase about speaking truth while drunk
- John 8:32 – Biblical adage
- John 18:38 – Verse of the Bible
- Project Veritas – American far-right activist group
- Truth Coming Out of Her Well – 1896 painting by Jean-Léon Gérôme
- Urim and Thummim – Objects used for divination in the early Abrahamic religions
- Via, Veritas, Vita – Words spoken by Jesus of Nazareth according to the Christian Gospel of John
