= Anne de Beaujeu Museum =

French art museum

- Musée Anne-de-Beaujeu
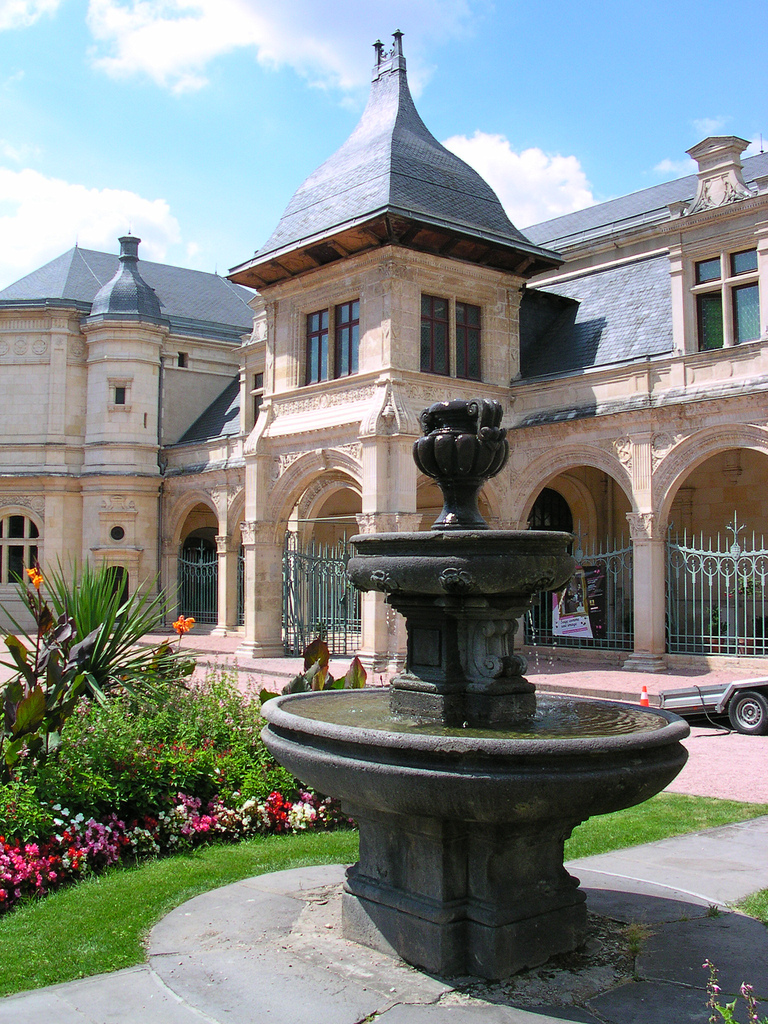
- Established: 5 June 1910
- Location: 3 Place du Colonel Laussedat; Moulins, Allier
- Coordinates: 46°34′02″N 3°19′49″E
- Website: musees.allier.fr

The Anne de Beaujeu Museum (French: Musée Anne-de-Beaujeu) is a museum of art and history, established since 1910 in the Renaissance pavilion of the Palais des Ducs de Bourbon in Moulins, Allier, in the Auvergne-Rhône-Alpes region. It adjoins the Maison Mantin, named after the collector Louis Mantin (1851–1905).

The museum is named after Anne of France (1461–1522), the daughter of Louis XI, who became Anne de Beaujeu by her union with the Duke of Bourbon Pierre de Beaujeu.

== History ==
Since 2004, the Anne de Beaujeu Museum, previously managed by a joint union representing the town of Moulins and the department of Allier, has become purely departmental. The museum has received the "Museum of France” label.

== Collections ==
The museum's collections are divided into five main themes, and they bring together some 20,000 works, including artifacts, archaeological finds, coins and medals, weapons and a natural history fund.

=== 19th century paintings and sculptures ===
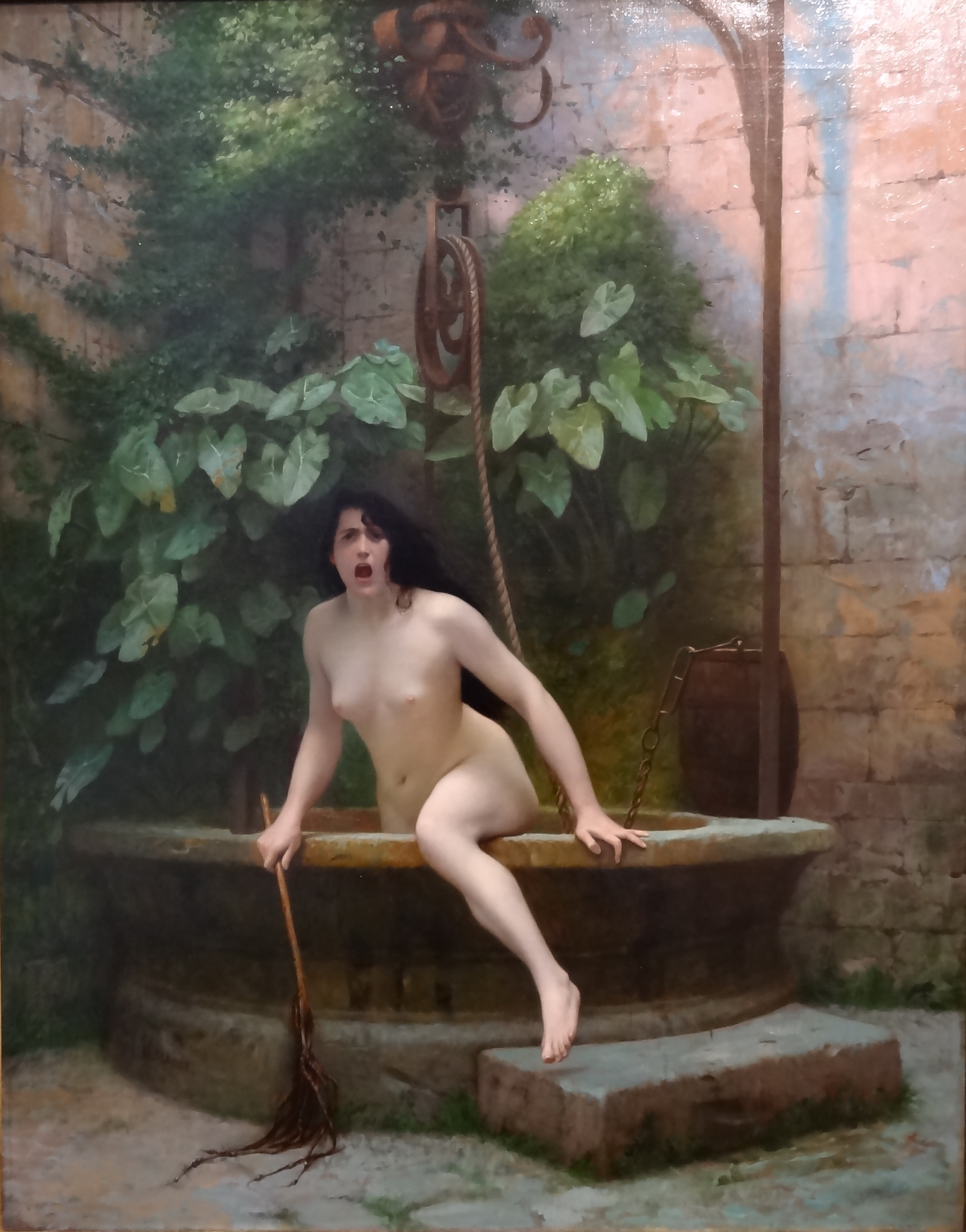
Truth Coming Out of Her Well

The museum's rich art collection of the second half of the 19th century contains works by Jean-Léon Gérôme, Jean-Paul Laurens, Ernest Meissonier, Alexandre Cabanel, Georges-Antoine Rochegrosse, and Jean-Jacques Henner. It includes:

- Truth Coming Out of Her Well, Jean-Léon Gérôme, oil on canvas (1896);
- Le Matin de Castiglione, Ernest Meissonier, oil on canvas (1891);
- The Men of Holy Office, Jean-Paul Laurens, oil on canvas (1889);
- Salammbô, Georges Rochegrosse, oil on canvas (1886);
- Le Bal des Ardents, Georges Rochegrosse, oil on canvas 11(1889);
- Venus to the change of Pâris, Émile Thomas, sculpture (1868), transfer of the state;
- Adam and Eve, Fernand Pelez (1876), transfer of the state;
- Portrait of a woman, called Jew with Fur, Marcellin Desboutin, oil on canvas (1882), transfer of the state.
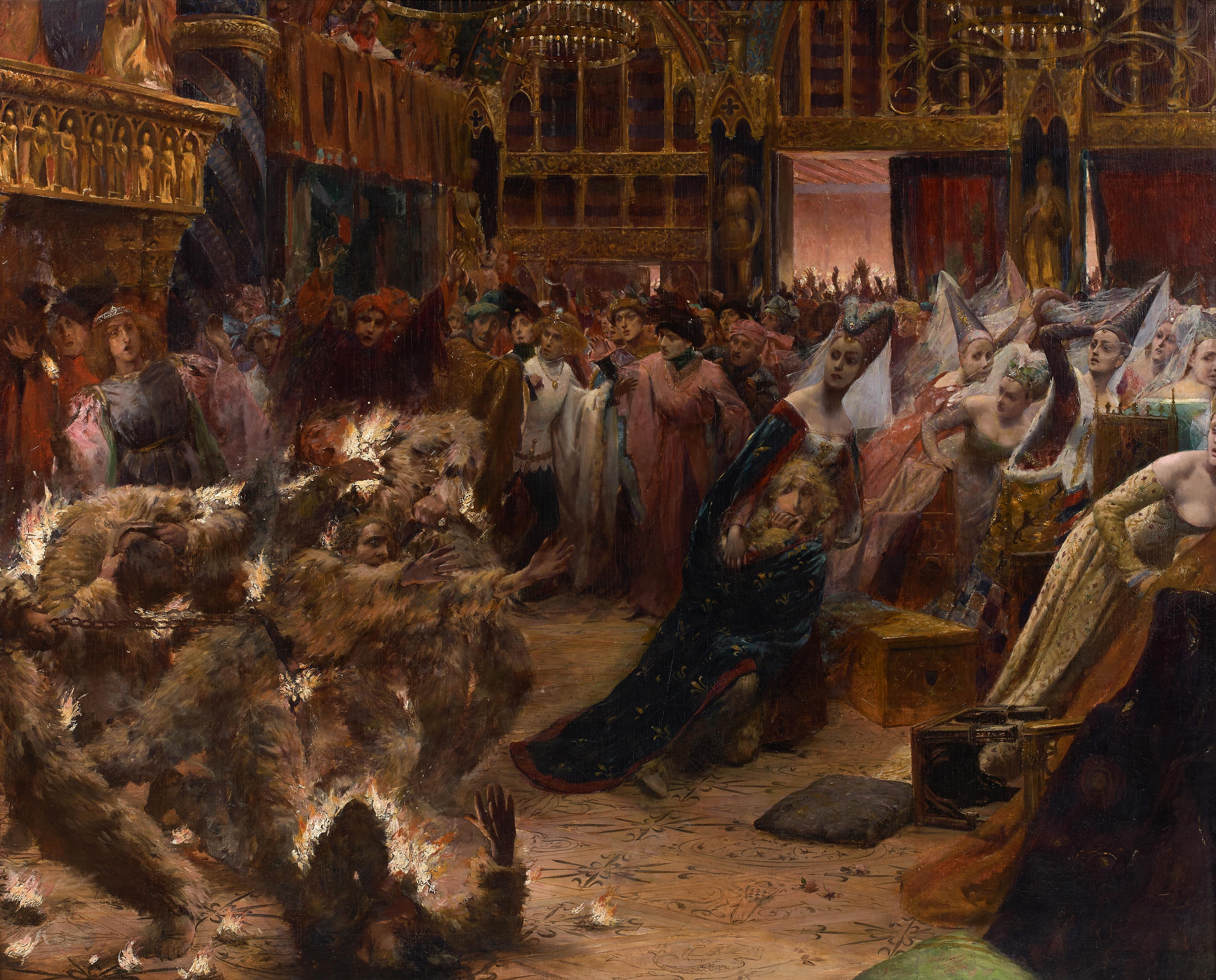
Le Bal des Ardents

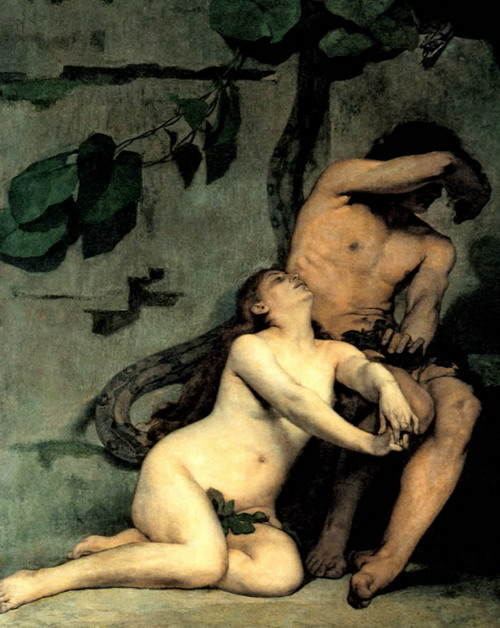
Adam and Eve

=== German and Flemish paintings of the 15th and 16th centuries ===
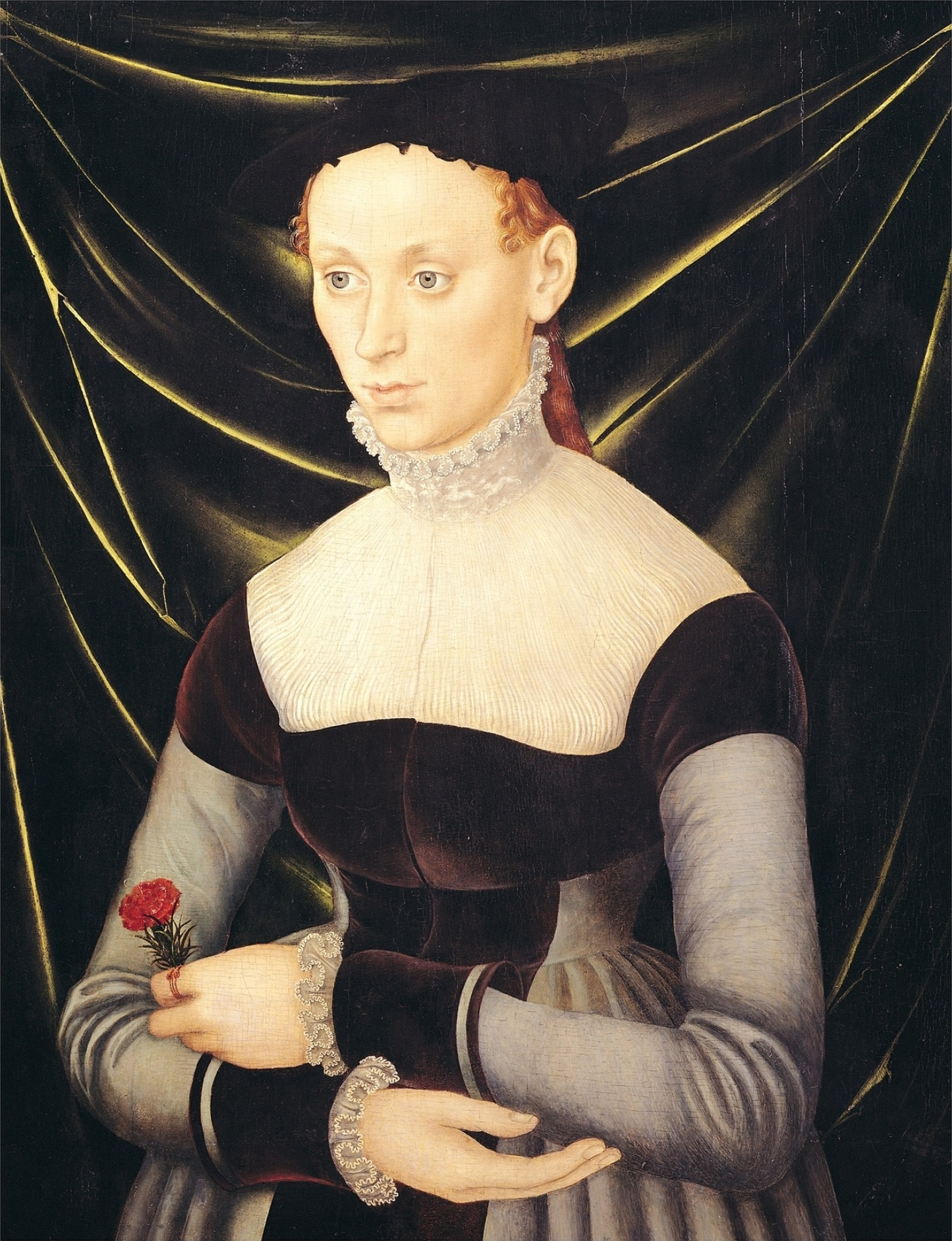
Woman with a Carnation

The museum has an important collection of German and Flemish paintings: altarpiece panels, portraits, and biblical scenes.

- Altarpiece of Saint Stephen, Master of Uttenheim (around 1465-1475), donated to the museum by the ironmaster Louis Rambourg (1801-1893);
- Woman with a Carnation, German school, oil on wood (around 1530);
- Altarpiece of the Adoration of the Magi, by the Master of Frankfurt, oil on wood (early 16th century);
- Delilah Cutting Samson’s Hair, German school, Master HB with the Griffin’s Head, oil on wood (16th century).
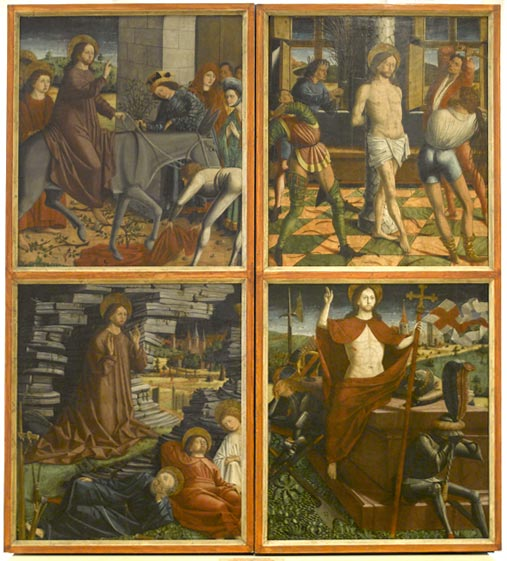
Altarpiece of Saint Stephen
