= Maison Mantin =

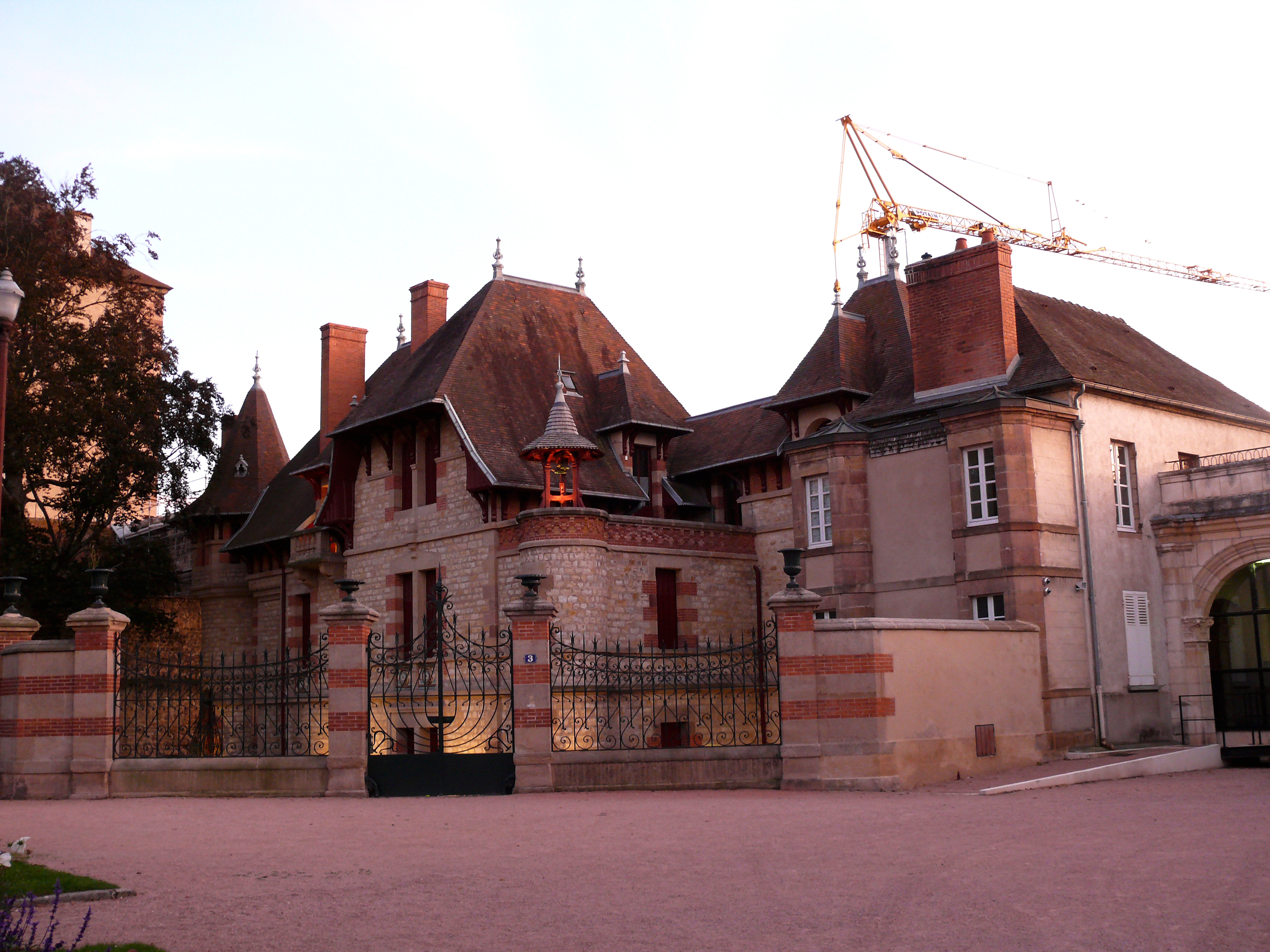
- The Maison Mantin, as seen from the side of Place Colonel-Laussedat, in a photo taken on September 15, 2011
- Interactive map of the Maison Mantin area

General information
- Type: Historical Mansion
- Architectural style: Eclectic, "Castle-villa"
- Location: Moulins, Allier, France
- Coordinates: 46°34′0.5″N 3°19′49.5″E
- Current tenants: Museum (Anne de Beaujeu Museum)
- Completed: 1893
- Renovated: 2011
- Client: Louis Mantin (1851 - 1905)

Design and construction
- Architect: René Moreau

The Maison Mantin (French pronunciation: [mɛzɔ̃ mɑ̃tɛ̃]; "Mantin House") is a late 19th-century French mansion located in the town of Moulins (Arrondissement de Moulins) in the Allier department of central France.

The mansion, shuttered for more than a century, opened its doors to the public in November 2010 as a museum.

== History ==
Maison Mantin was commissioned by Louis Mantin, a wealthy man from Moulins, who wanted to showcase his art and antiques collection. It was designed by a noted local architect, René-Justin Moreau (April 28, 1858 - September 18, 1924), in collaboration with his father, Jean-Bélizaire Moreau (1828–1899), also an architect, and built in 1893.

Mantin bequeathed the mansion to the town of Moulins in his will, written before his death in 1905. The will stated that the house be kept intact, so as to show to visitors in 100 years "a specimen of a bourgeois home of the nineteenth century".

Consequently, the house was kept shuttered for over a century, with all its original contents, and fell into disrepair. After extensive restoration, it was opened as a museum, and a showcase for the eclectic taste of its former owner.

== The Building ==
The first draft of the architects' design for Maison Mantin was akin to a Gothic mansion, but the final design was more picturesque, borrowing many of the elements of a seaside villa. The architect gave free rein to his taste for eclecticism: in the study and dining room with wood paneling, and the neo-renaissance decor of the "room of the four seasons" with plaster decorations and paintings in the style of Louis XVIII; the modern bathroom has stained glass and paintings in the Art Nouveau style. The project is important in that it paved the way for the design trend of the "castle-villa".

The house incorporates the technological innovations of its period: electrical lighting, hot-and-cold faucets, overhead shower and flushing toilet.

== The Collection ==
The museum contains a dizzying maze of paintings, books, photographs, miniature objects, stuffed animals, ceramics, minerals, carvings and rare and unusual objects gathered by Louis Mantin from his travels in different parts of the world. The rich collection and the ornamentation of the house give it a unique character.

The museum also has a screening room.

== Visitor Information ==
The entrance to La Maison Mantin is in common with the Anne de Beaujeu Museum, and permitted only with a guide-lecturer.

== Photo gallery ==
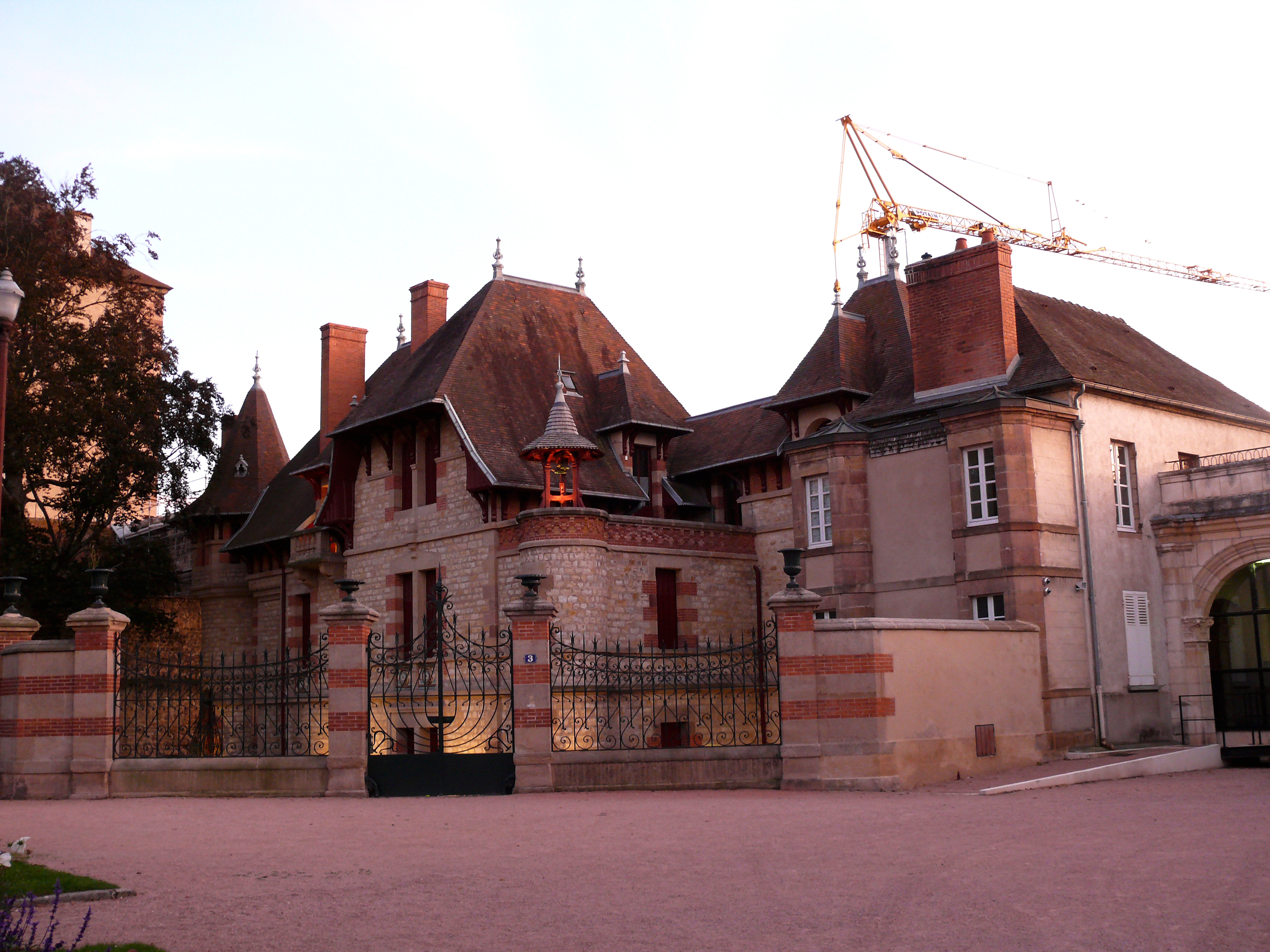

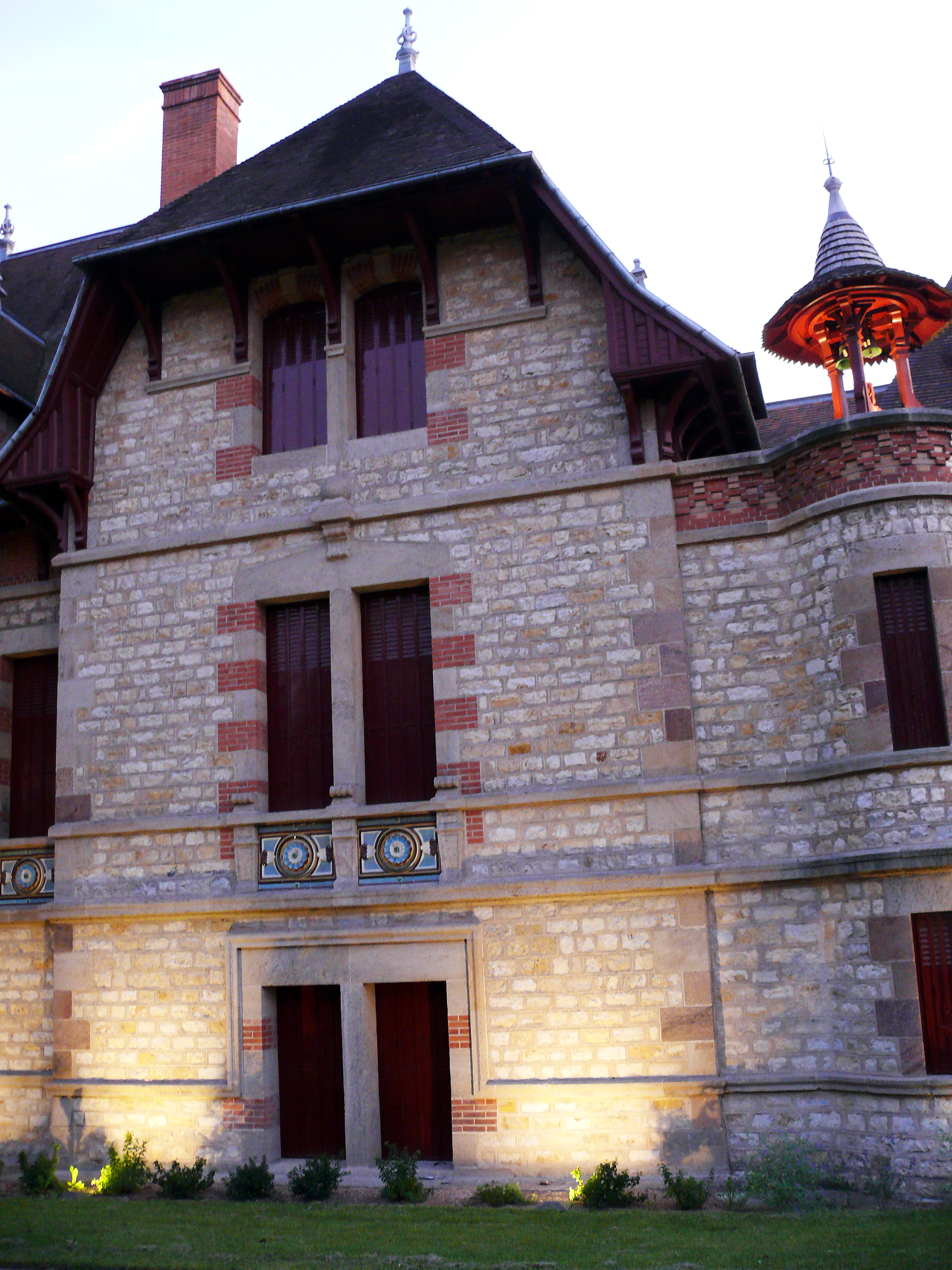

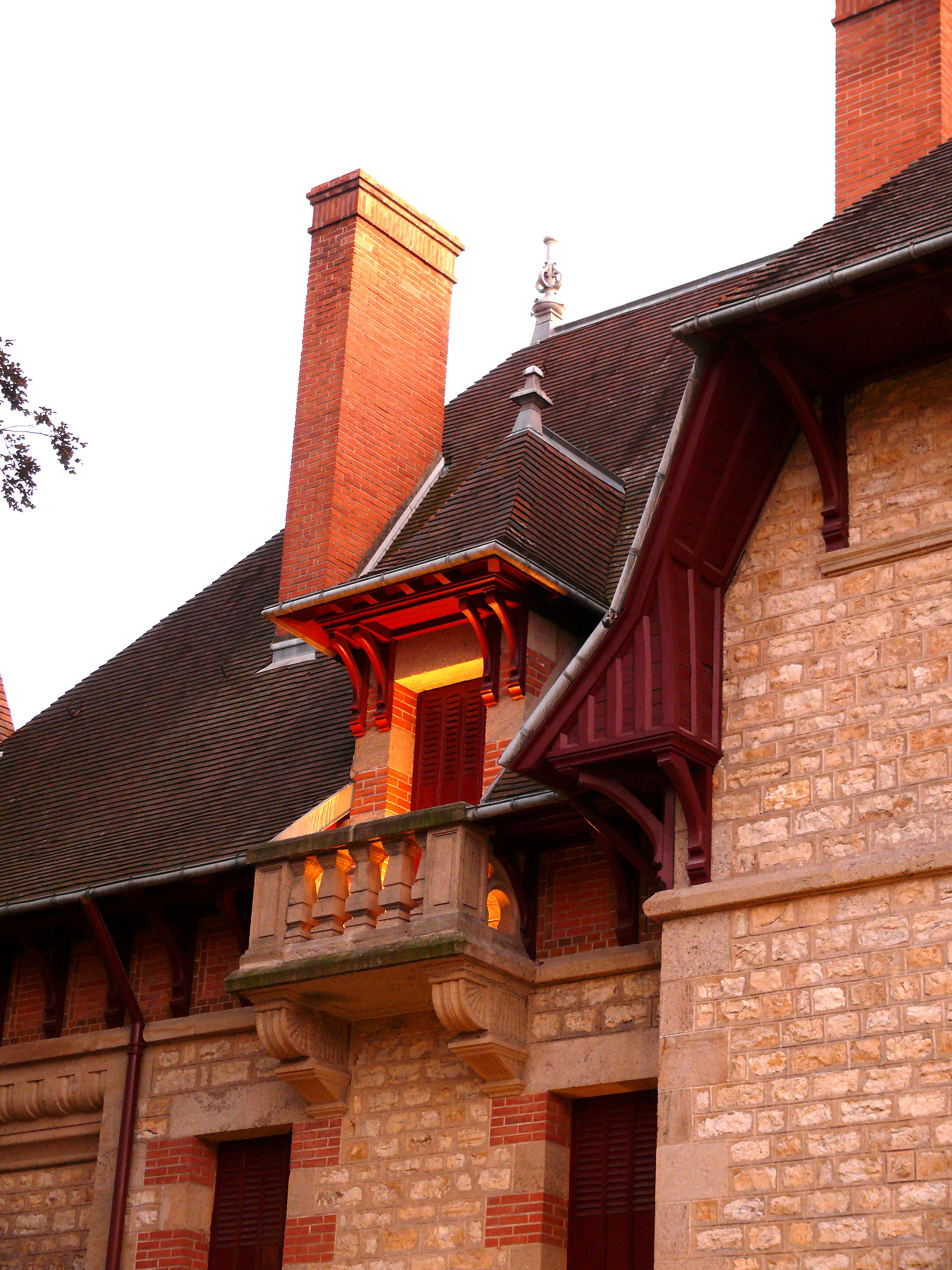

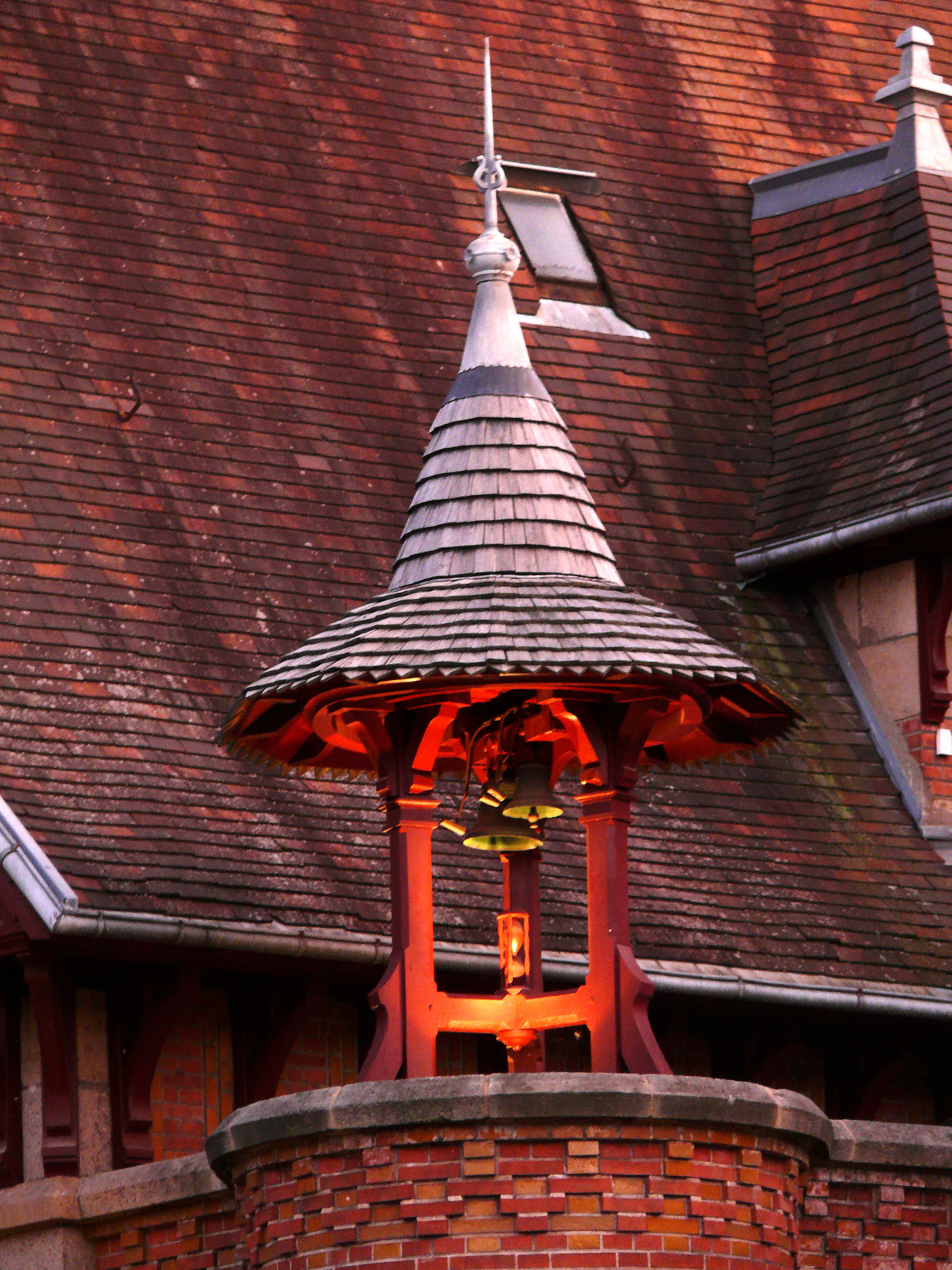

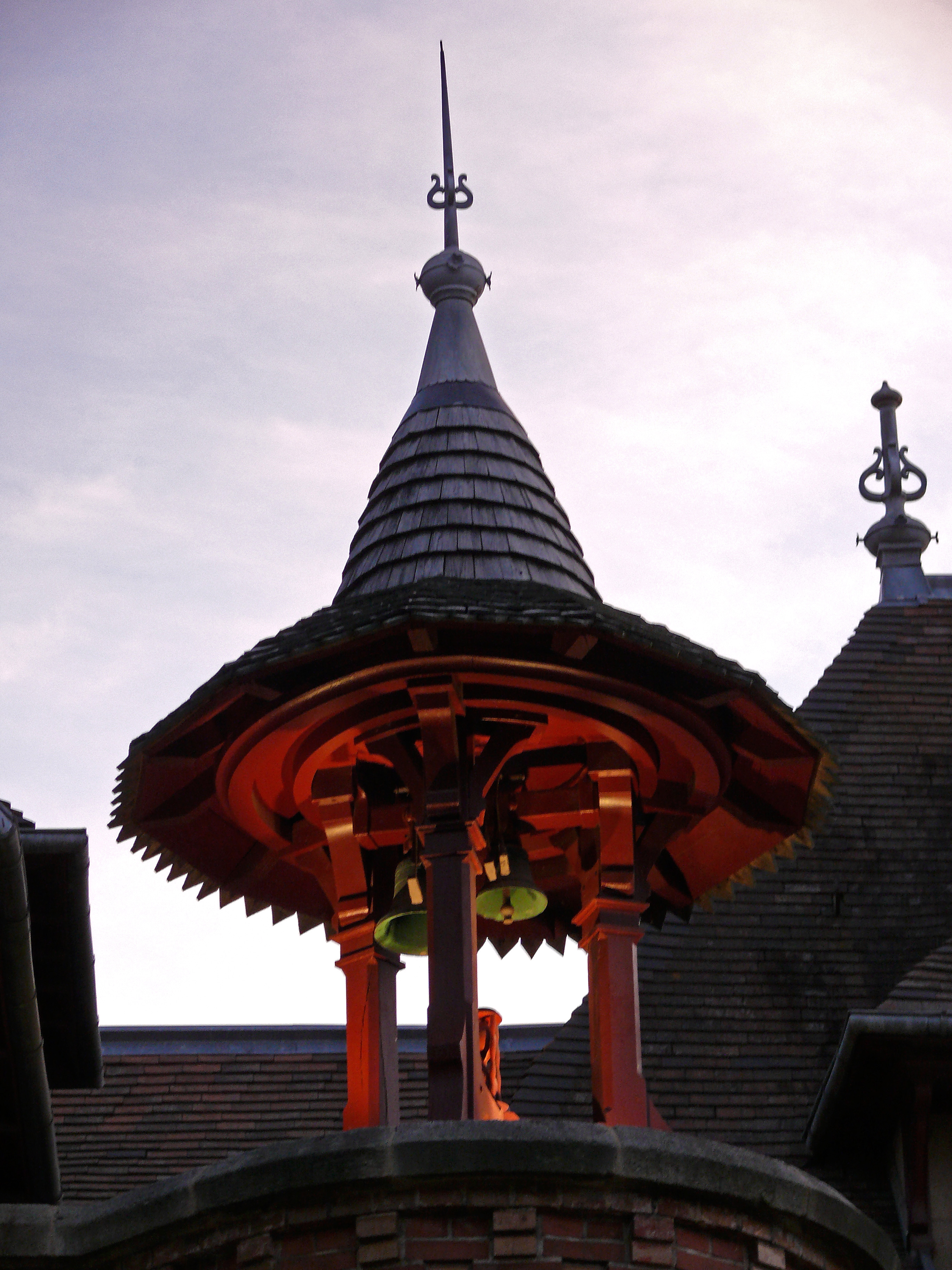

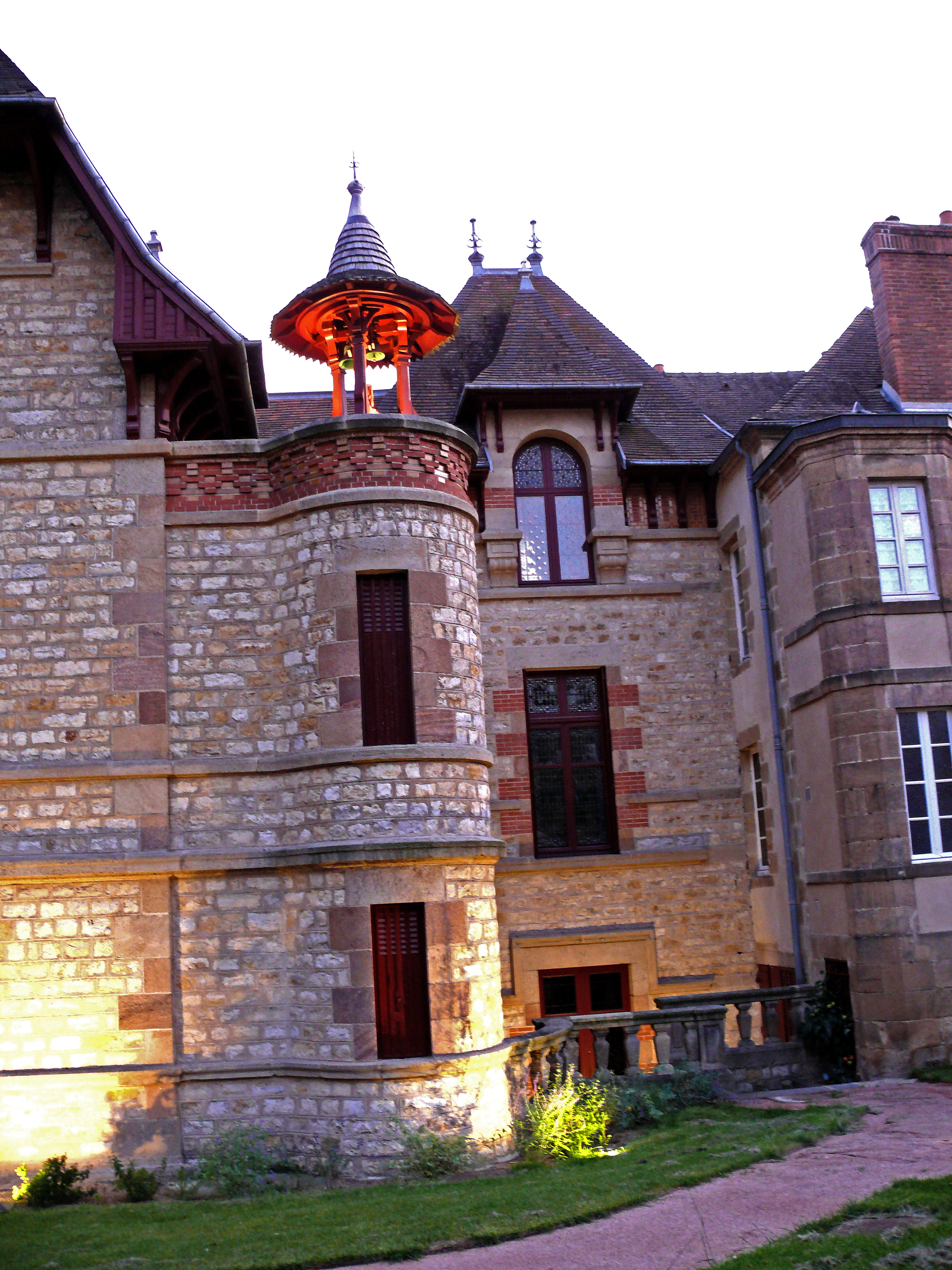
