= Musée Jean-Léon Gérôme =

Art museum in Vesoul, France

Georges-Garret Museum
- Musée Georges-Garret
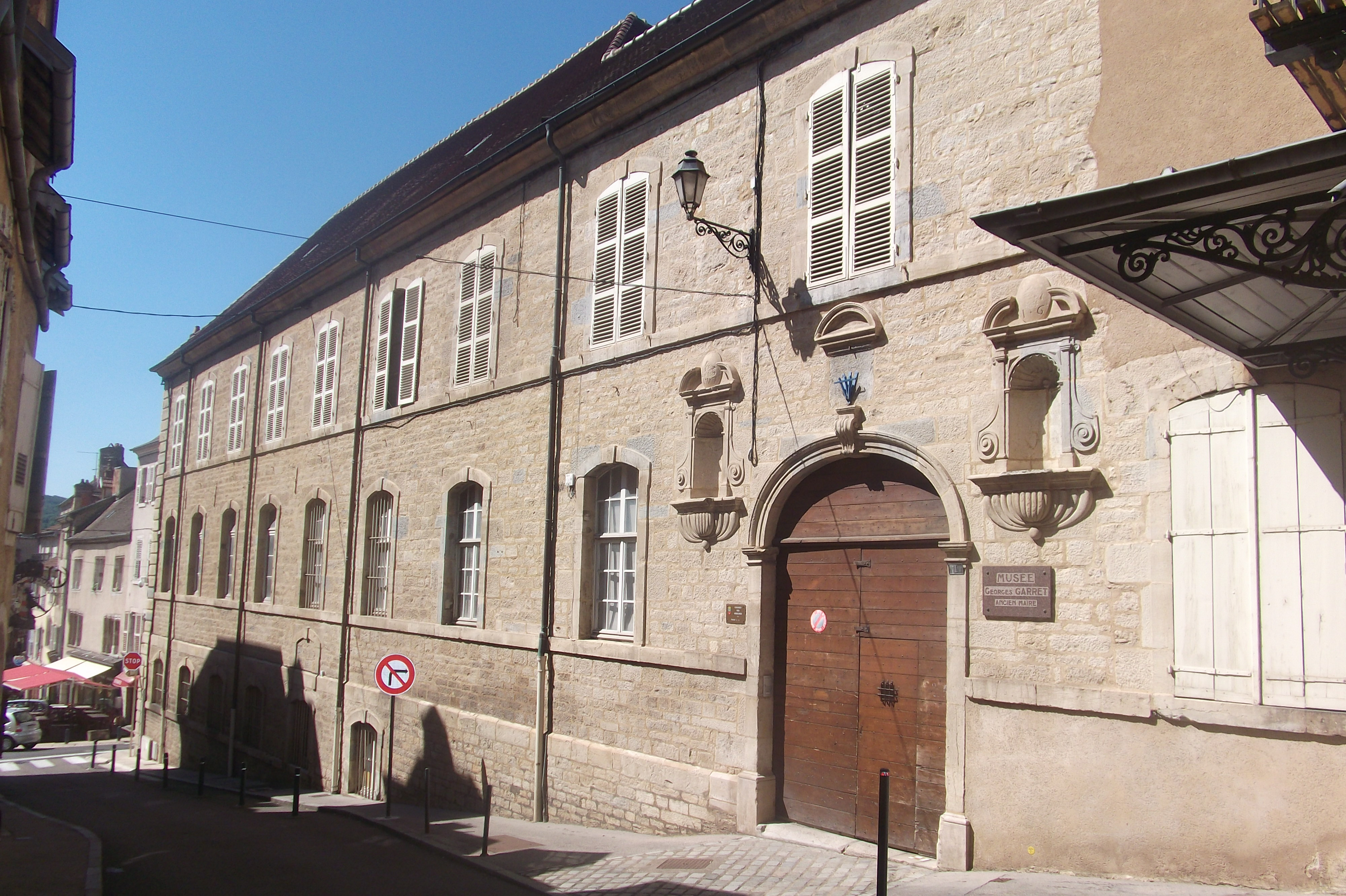
- View of the museum
- Established: 1882
- Location: Vesoul, Haute-Saône, France
- Coordinates: 47.6331°N 6.1401°E
- Type: Art museum
- Key holdings: Jean-Léon Gérôme
- Collections: art, archaeology

The Musée Jean-Léon Gérôme (a.k.a. Musée Georges-Garret or Georges-Garret Museum) is located in the city of Vesoul, in the Haute-Saône departement of eastern France.

The museum was created in 1882, and since 1981 has been installed in a former 17th-century Ursuline convent, comprising 14 rooms (9 fine art rooms and 5 archeology rooms) spread over two levels. The first level of the museum presents a collection of Gallo-Roman funerary steles as well as objects taken from various excavations in Haute-Saône (including those of an important villa from the 2nd century AD). The second level exhibits paintings and sculptures of the Middle Ages, Renaissance, and especially the 18th and 19th centuries.

The most significant holdings of the museum are paintings and sculptures by Jean-Léon Gérôme (1824–1904), who was born in Vesoul. Gérôme donated a number of his works to the museum during his lifetime, and his heirs donated more works after his death. These range from the very early Saint Vincent de Paul of 1847 to the very late self-portrait of the artist painting his statue The Ball Player of 1902. As result, the museum's Gérôme collection, displayed in several rooms, is exceptional.

Displayed along with Gérôme are by works of artists of Haute-Saône whom he trained at the École des Beaux-Arts in Paris, beginning in 1864. These artists collectively became known as the École Haut-Saônoise, or School of Haute-Saône. They painted landscapes, scenes of country life, and portraits. Among the better known are Gustave Courtois, Jules-Alexis Muenier, and Pascal Dagnan-Bouveret.

== Gallery (chronological) ==
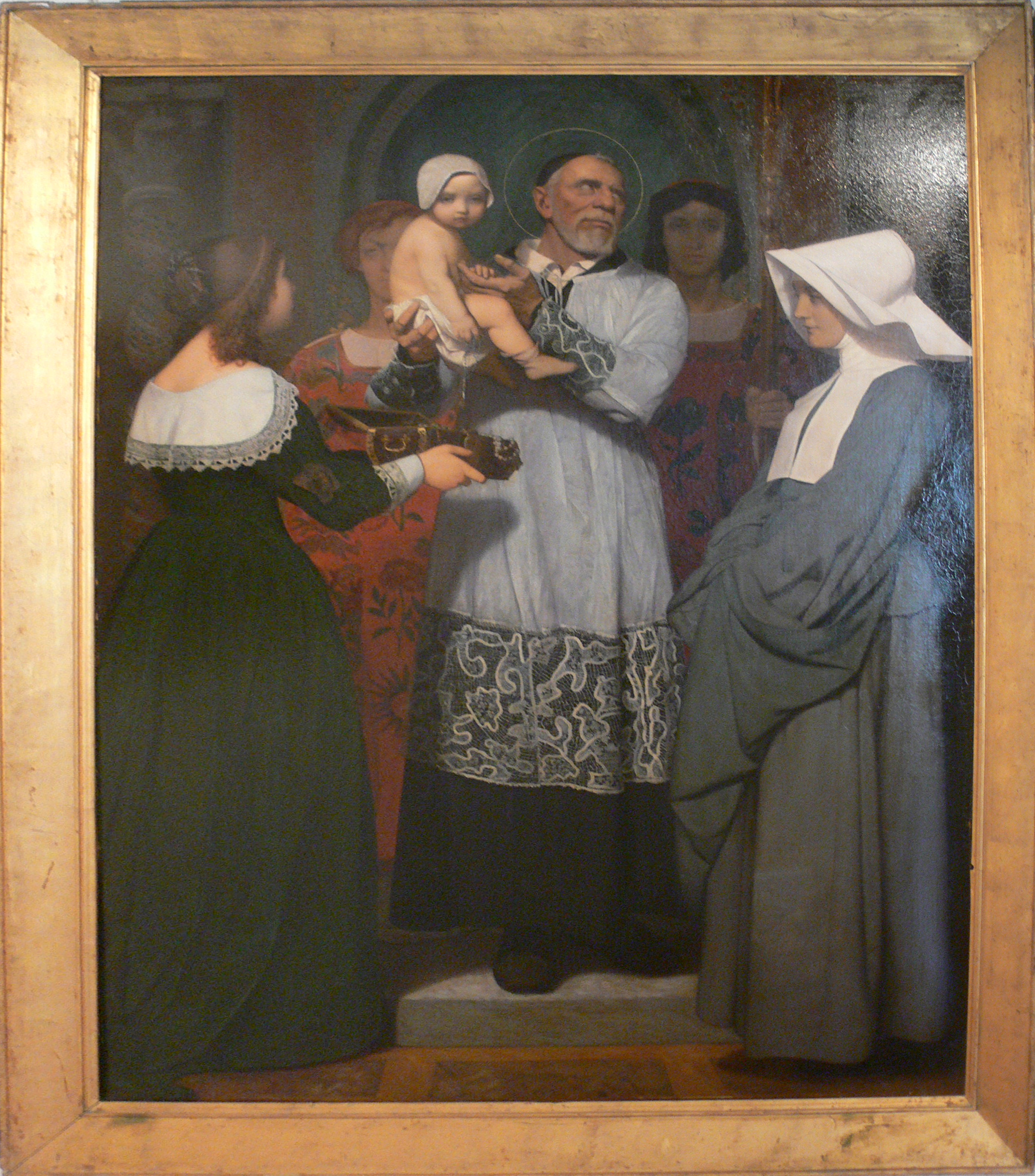
Jean-Léon Gérôme, Saint Vincent de Paul, 1847

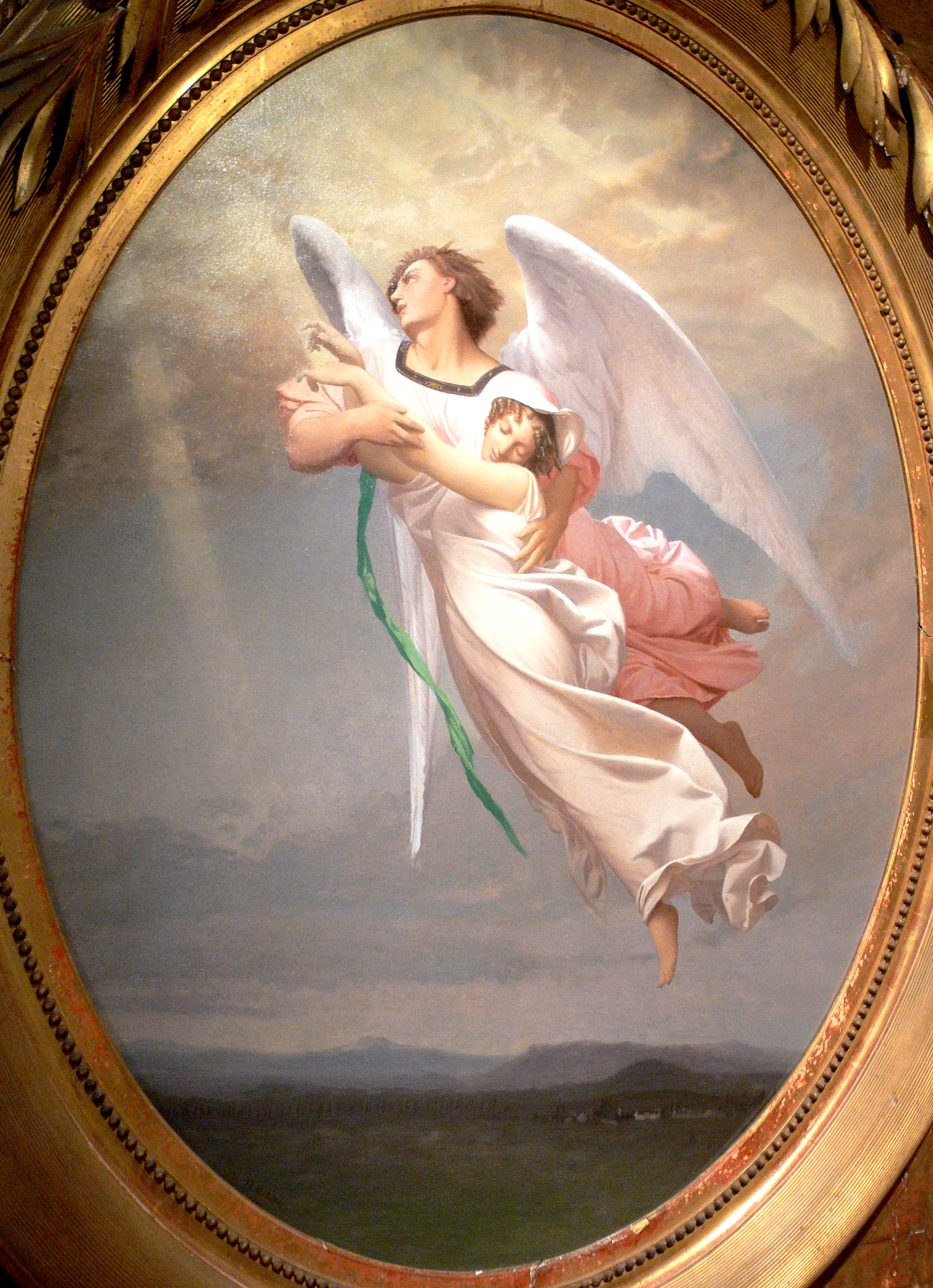
Jean-Léon Gérôme, A Soul Carried Away by an Angel, 1853

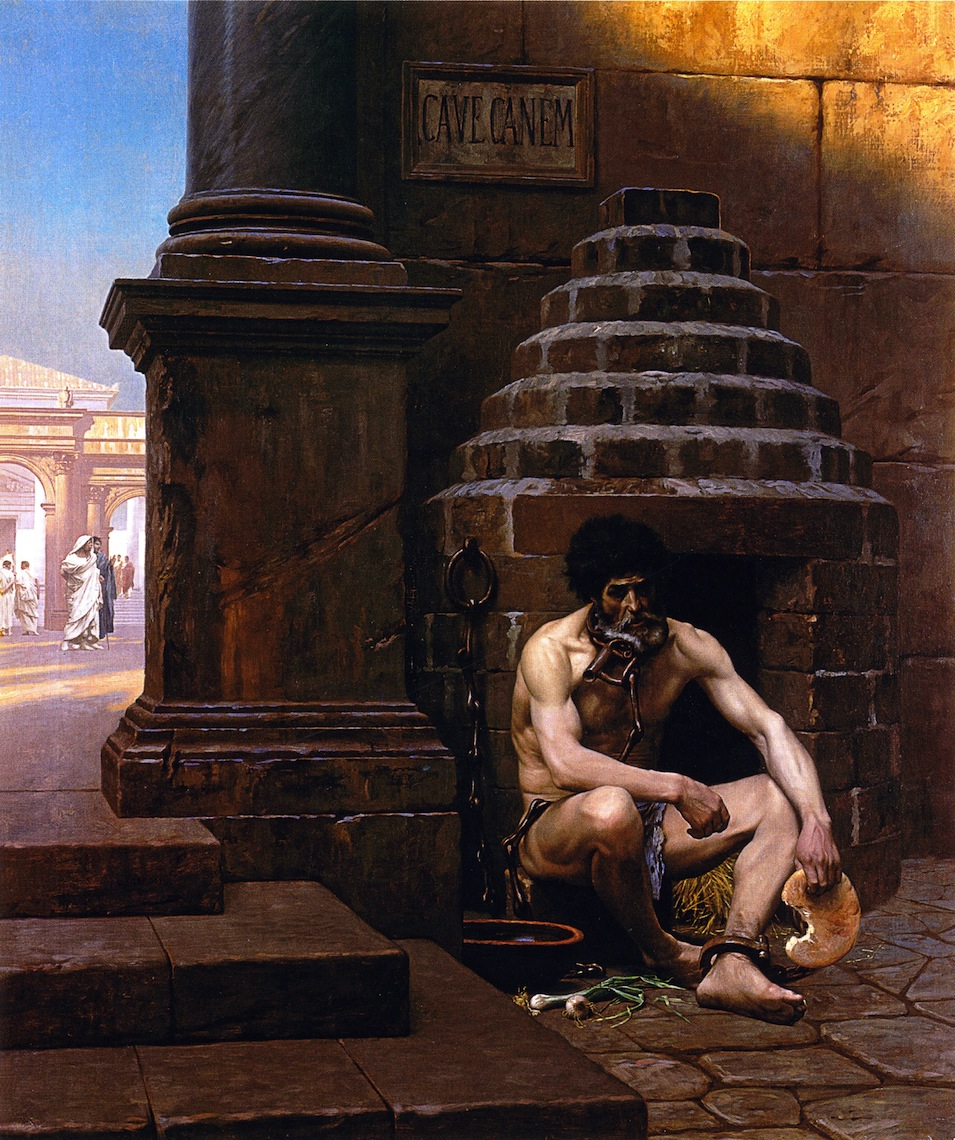
Jean-Léon Gérôme, Cave Canem, 1881,

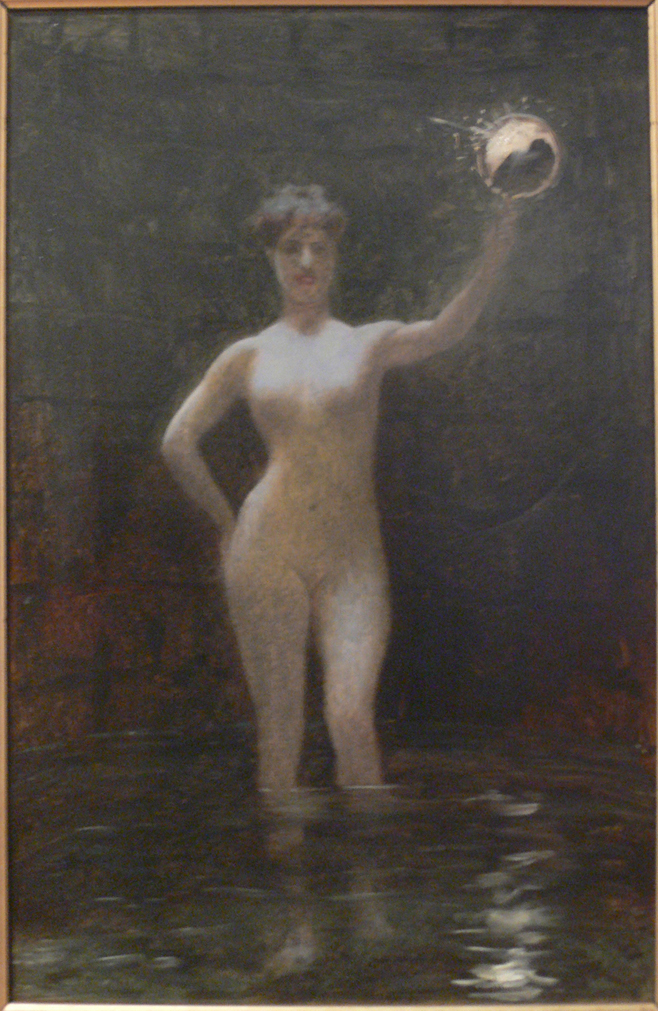
Jean-Léon Gérôme, Truth at the Bottom of a Well, study for a painting of 1895

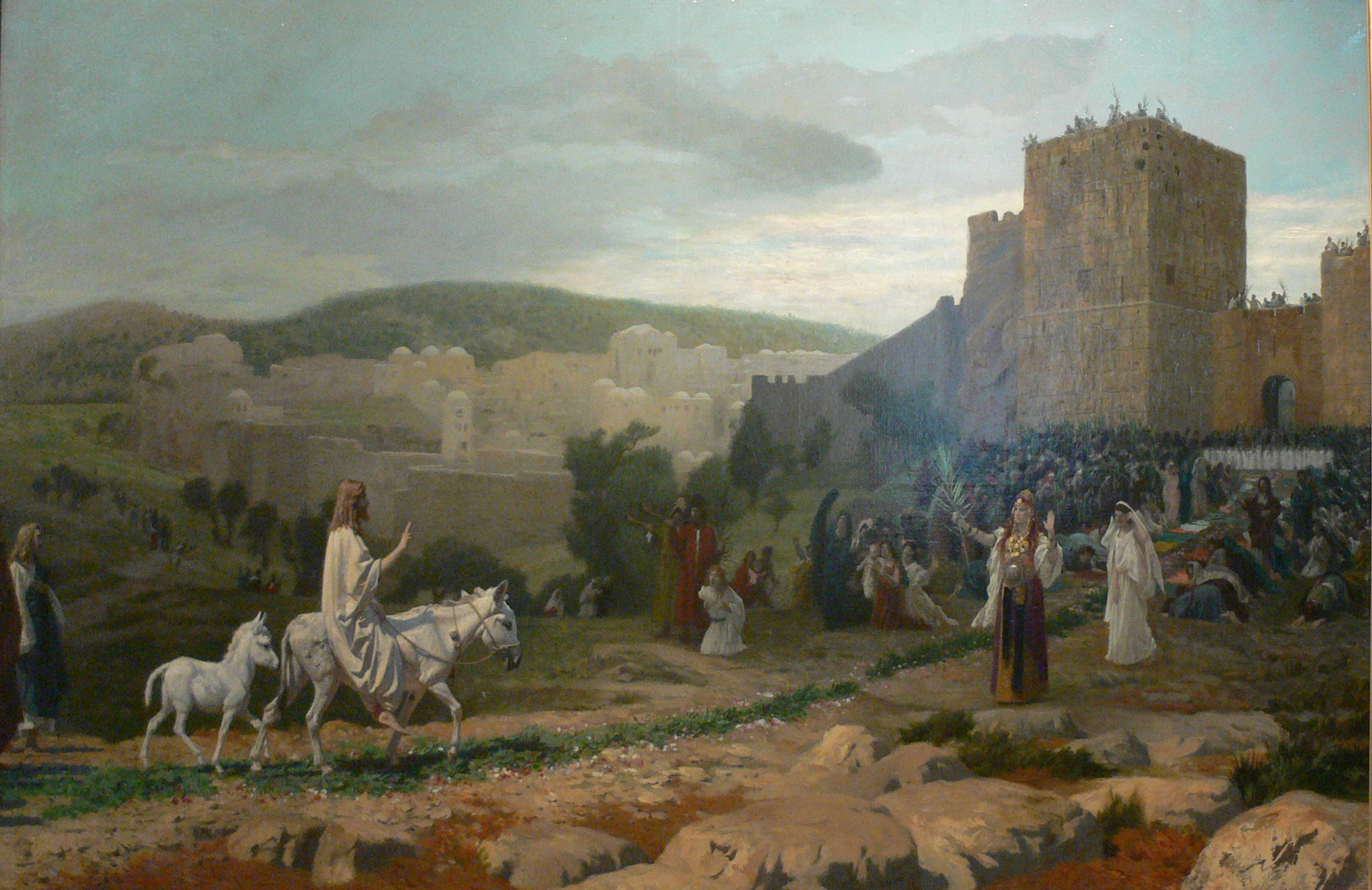
Jean-Léon Gérôme, Entry of the Christ at Jerusalem, 1897

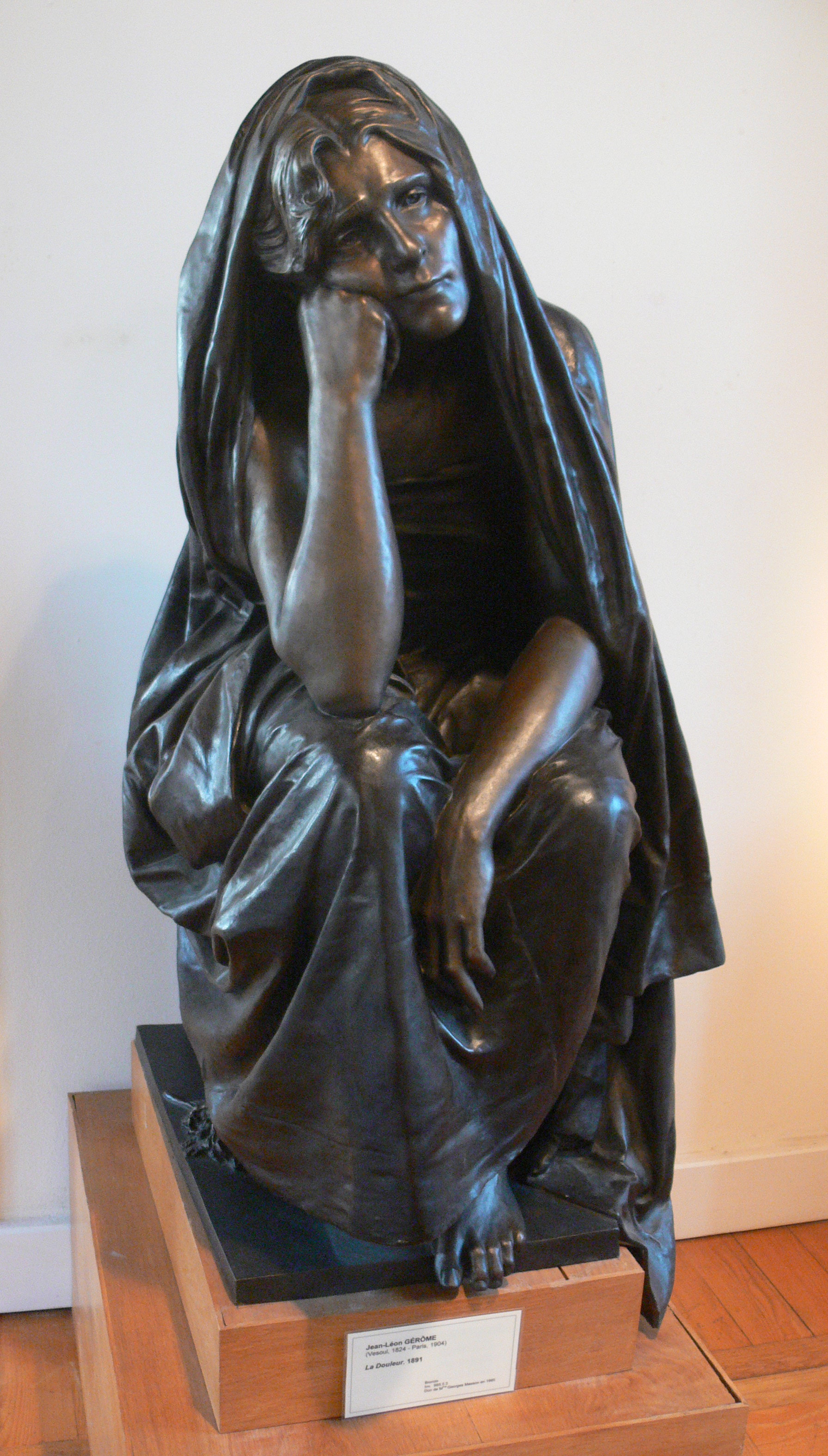
Jean-Léon Gérôme, La Douleur, 1891

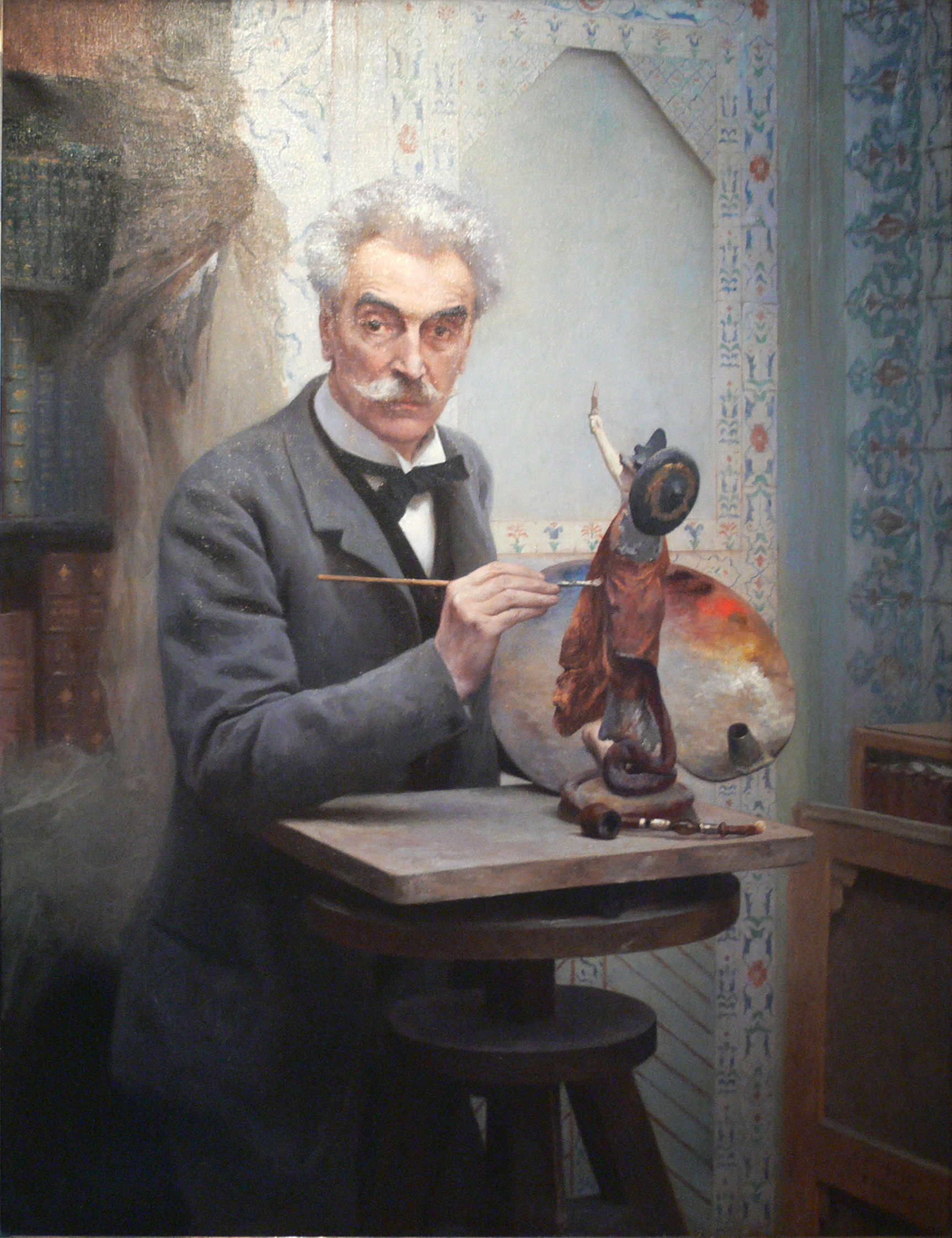
Fernand Cormon, The Sculptor at Work, 1891

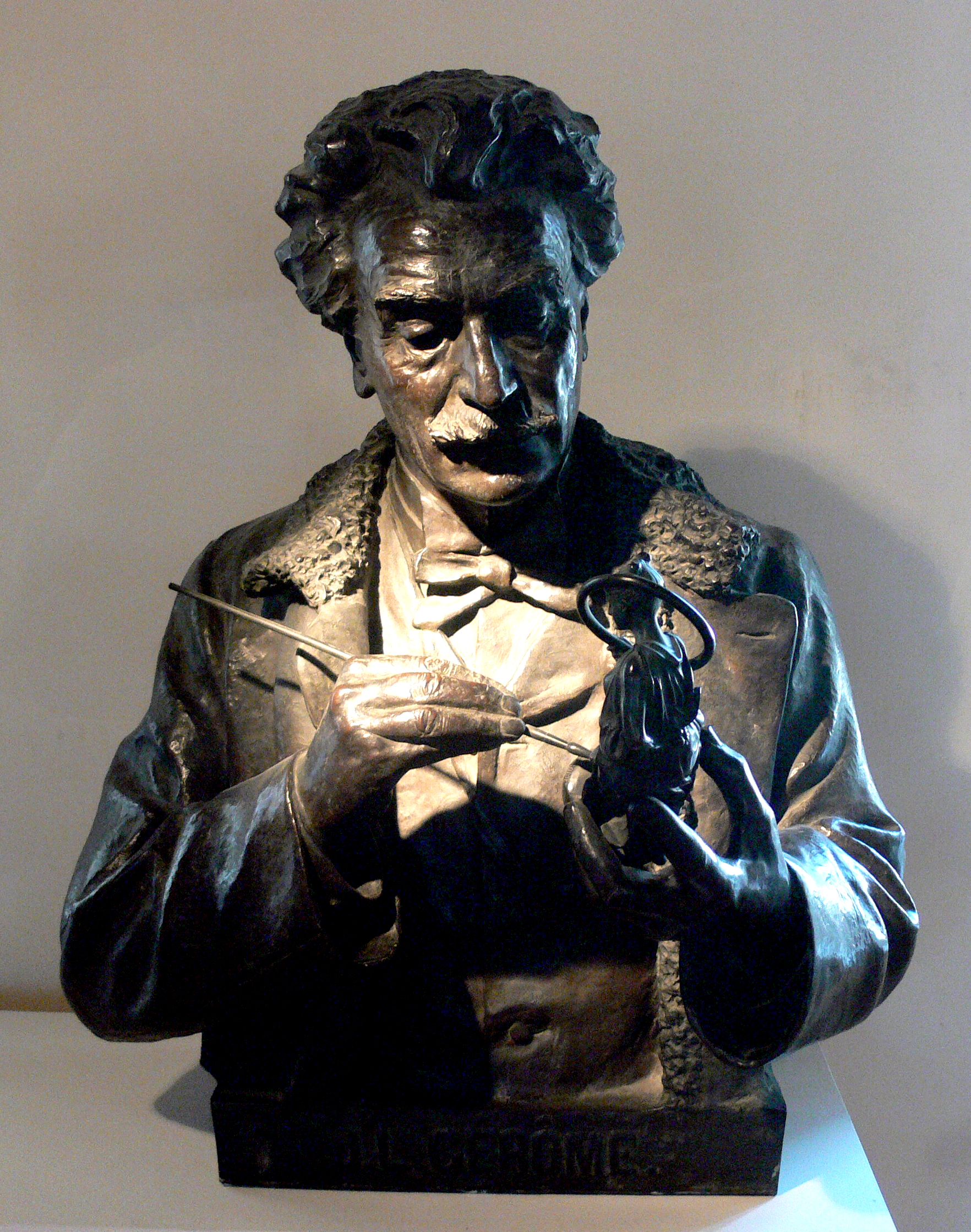
Léopold Bernhard Bernstamm, Gérome painting a hoop dancer, 1897

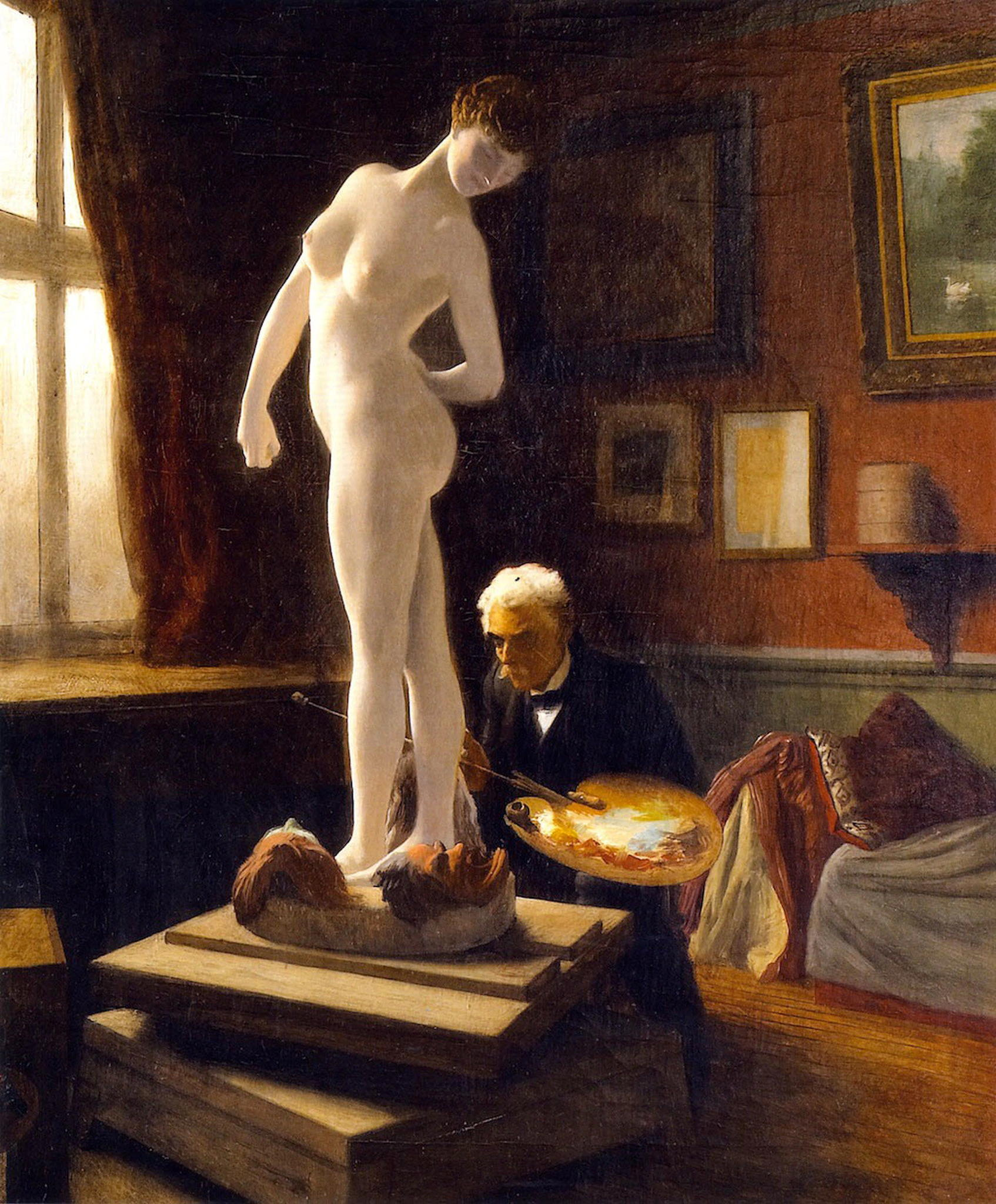
Jean-Léon Gérôme, self-portrait, painting The Ball Player, 1902

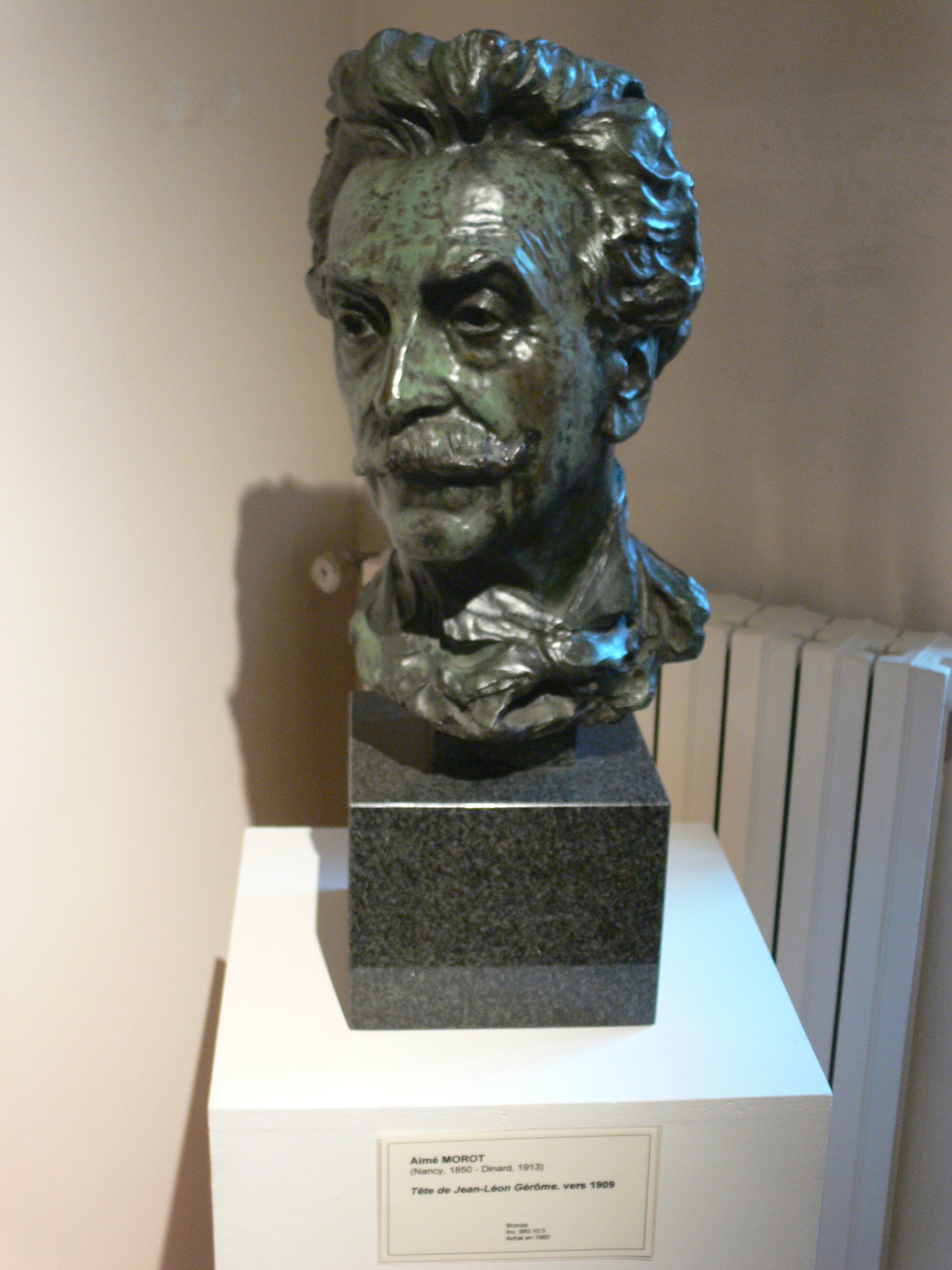
Aimé Morot, bronze head of Jean-Léon Gérôme, 1909
