= Moulins, Allier =

Moulins
- Prefecture and commune
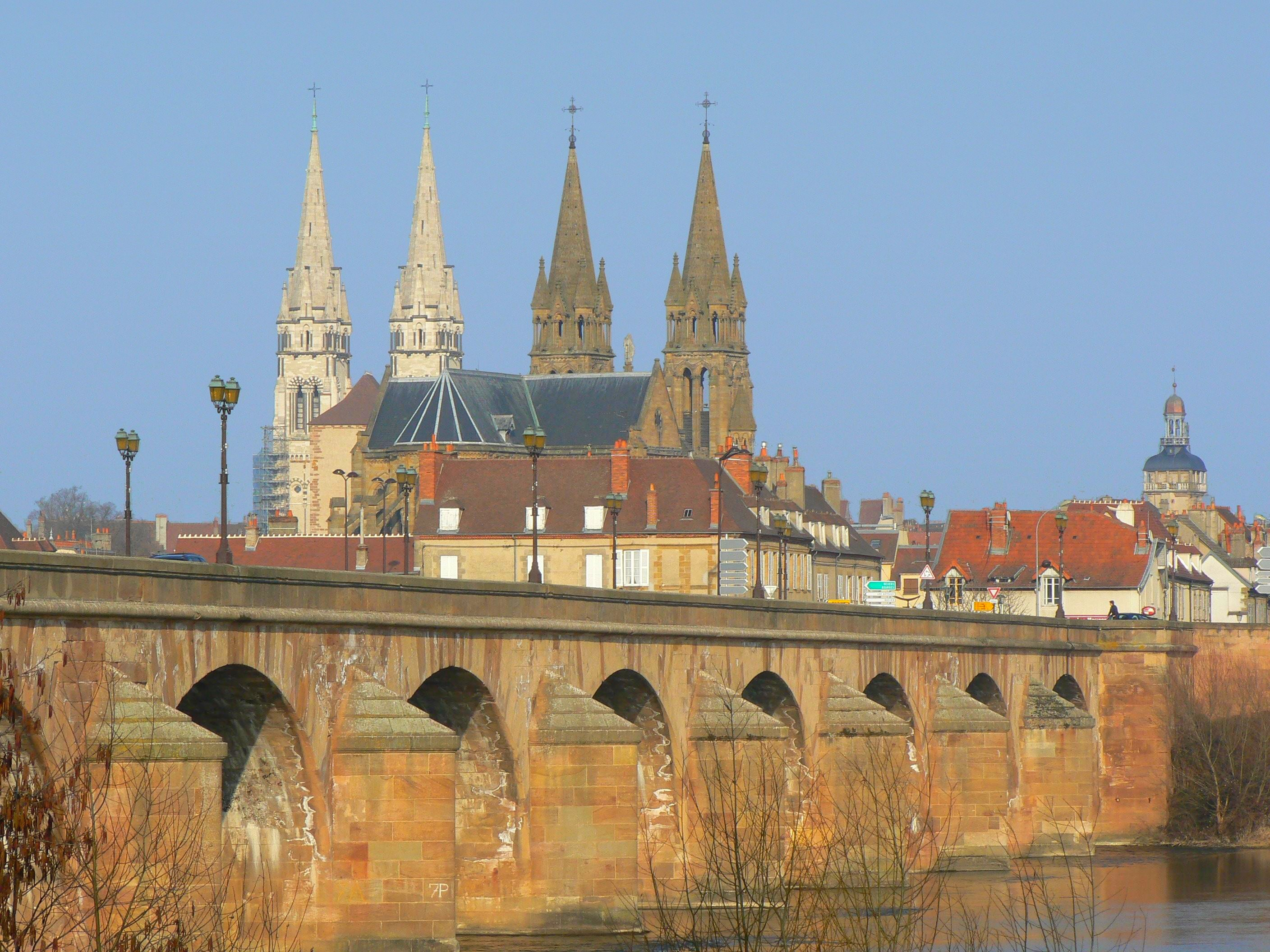
- Views of Moulins

- Coat of arms
- Location of Moulins
- Location within France Location within Auvergne-Rhône-Alpes
- Coordinates: 46°33′55″N 3°20′00″E
- Country: France
- Region: Auvergne-Rhône-Alpes
- Department: Allier
- Arrondissement: Moulins
- Canton: Moulins-1 and 2
- Intercommunality: CA Moulins Communauté

Government
  - Mayor (2026–32): Benoit Faivre
- Area^{1}: 8.61 km^{2} (3.32 sq mi)
- Elevation: 220 m (720 ft)
- Highest elevation: 240 m (790 ft)
- Lowest elevation: 202 m (663 ft)
- Population (2023): 19,206
  - Density: 2,230/km^{2} (5,780/sq mi)
- Time zone: UTC+01:00 (CET)
  - Summer (DST): UTC+02:00 (CEST)
- INSEE/Postal code: 03190 /03000
- Website: ville-moulins.fr
- ^{1} French Land Register data, which excludes lakes, ponds, glaciers > 1 km^{2} (0.386 sq mi or 247 acres) and river estuaries.

Moulins (French pronunciation: [mulɛ̃], Molins in Bourbonnais oïl dialect) is a commune in central France, capital of the Allier department. It is located on the river Allier.

Among its many tourist attractions are the Maison Mantin, the Anne de Beaujeu Museum, and The National Center of Costume and Scenography.

== Geography ==
Moulins is located on the banks of the river Allier.

Moulins-sur-Allier station, in the centre of the town, has direct trains to Paris (Gare de Bercy), which take about 2 hours 25 minutes. The A79 motorway passes south of the town. Montbeugny Airport is a small airport located near Moulins.

== History ==
The name Moulins literally means 'mills' in French, and refers to mills along the Allier.

Before the French Revolution, Moulins was the capital of the province of Bourbonnais and the seat of the Dukes of Bourbon. It appears in documented records at least as far back as the year 990. In 1232, Archambaud VIII, Sire de Bourbon granted a franchise to the village's inhabitants.

The town achieved greater prominence in 1327, when Charles IV elevated Louis I de Clermont to Duke of Bourbon. Either Louis or the later Peter II, Duke of Bourbon and of Auvergne moved the capital of the province from Bourbon-l'Archambault to Moulins.

Note: This article in French suggests Pierre II moved the capital, while the local tourism website (also in French) suggests it was Louis I.

In February 1566 it became eponymous to the Edict of Moulins, an important royal ordinance dealing with many aspects of the administration of justice and feudal and ecclesiastical privilege, including limitations on the appanages held by French princes, abrogation of the levy of rights of tallage claimed by seigneurs over their dependants, and provisions for a system of concessions on rivers.

This was the birthplace of the great 19th-century operatic baritone and art collector Jean-Baptiste Faure. In the 20th century, Coco Chanel went to school in Moulins as an orphan, before moving to Paris, where she became a fashion designer and major innovator in women's clothing.

== Politics and administration ==
=== Territorial division ===
Moulins is the prefecture of Allier, even though it is not the most populated commune of the department.

=== Elections to municipal and intercommunal councils ===
==== Mayors of Moulins ====
The position of mayor has existed in Moulins since 1518. The current mayor is Benoit Faivre, elected at the 2026 elections.

List of successive mayors of Moulins since the liberation of France
In office		Name	Party	Capacity	Ref.
August 1944	May 1945	Jean Dufloux			
May 1945	October 1947	Henri Gromolard	CNR		
October 1947	March 1959	Maurice Tinland			
March 1959	1971	Jacques Pligot	RI		
1971	1989	Hector Rolland	RPR	Deputy for Allier (1968–1981 & 1986–1988)	
1989	25 June 1995	Paul Chauvat	DVD		
25 June 1995	2026	Pierre-André Périssol	RPR then UMP then LR	Minister of Housing (2002–2007)	
2026	Incumbent	Benoit Faivre	DVD		

=== Other elections ===
Election	1st round								2nd round					
Election	1st	%	2nd	%	3rd	%	4th	%	1st	%	2nd	%	3rd	%
2014 - European	UMP	25.04	FN	21.53	PS	16.31	UDI	10.74	Single round election only.					
2015 - Regional	UMP	38.14	PS	22.93	FN	20.52	PCF	7.90	UMP	44.77	PS-PCF-EELV	36.81	FN	18.42
2017 - Presidential	LREM	26.61	LR	21.15	LFI	19.94	FN	18.22	LREM	70.71	FN	29.29	No 3rd party.	
2017 - Legislative	LR	29.79	LREM	28.61	PCF	17.28	FN	8.54	LREM	50.42	PCF	49.58	No 3rd party.	
2019 - European	FN	22.71	LREM	21.77	LR	11.93	EELV	9.82	Single round election only.					
2020 - Municipal	LR	45.89	DVD	29.70	PCF	21.83	LO	2.56	LR	48.14	DVD	30.82	PCF	21.03

=== International relations ===
Moulins is twinned with:

- Bad Vilbel, Germany since 26 October 1990
- Montepulciano, Italy

== Population ==
Historical population

Year	Pop.	±% p.a.
1793	13,249	—
1800	13,509	+0.28%
1806	14,101	+0.72%
1821	13,697	−0.19%
1831	14,672	+0.69%
1836	15,231	+0.75%
1841	15,377	+0.19%
1846	17,110	+2.16%
1851	17,318	+0.24%
1856	18,069	+0.85%
1861	17,581	−0.55%
1866	19,890	+2.50%
1872	20,385	+0.41%
1876	21,774	+1.66%
1881	21,156	−0.57%
1886	21,721	+0.53%
1891	22,665	+0.85%
1896	22,215	−0.40%
1901	22,340	+0.11%

Year	Pop.	±% p.a.
1906	21,888	−0.41%
1911	21,990	+0.09%
1921	22,968	+0.44%
1926	23,306	+0.29%
1931	22,225	−0.95%
1936	22,369	+0.13%
1946	23,254	+0.39%
1954	24,441	+0.62%
1962	23,909	−0.27%
1968	25,979	+1.39%
1975	26,067	+0.05%
1982	25,159	−0.51%
1990	22,799	−1.22%
1999	21,892	−0.45%
2007	20,251	−0.97%
2012	18,959	−1.31%
2017	19,664	+0.73%
2023	19,206	−0.39%

Source: EHESS and INSEE (1968-2023)

== Museums ==
- Centre National du Costume de Scene (museum)

== Notable people ==
- Antoine Gilbert Griffet de Labaume (1756–1805), translator and man of letters
- Théodore de Banville (1823–1891), poet and playwright
- Jean Pastelot (1820–1870), painter and caricaturist
- Coco Chanel, fashion designer, started as a cabaret singer
- Philippe N'Dioro, footballer
- Jean-Luc Perrot (born 1959), pipe organ player and composer
- Stéphane Risacher, basketball player for the French national team
- Jean-Baptiste Faure, opera singer
- Samuel Paty, slain teacher
- Claude Louis Hector de Villars (1653–1734), Marshal General of France
- Gilbert Mercier (1957), author of "The Orwellian Empire" and journalist
- Louis Jacques Brunet (1811), ancient professor of natural history
- James FitzJames, 1st Duke of Berwick (1670–1734)
- Rahel Shtainshnaider, footballer
- Antoine Dauvergne (1713-1797), composer

== Notable companies ==
- Decauville factory
- Manitowoc Company

== Climate ==
Climate data for Moulins (Yzeure) (1991–2020 normals, extremes 1959–present)
Month	Jan	Feb	Mar	Apr	May	Jun	Jul	Aug	Sep	Oct	Nov	Dec	Year
Record high °C (°F)	18.2 (64.8)	25.8 (78.4)	26.0 (78.8)	29.6 (85.3)	33.2 (91.8)	40.9 (105.6)	43.2 (109.8)	42.0 (107.6)	36.1 (97.0)	31.9 (89.4)	23.6 (74.5)	19.0 (66.2)	43.2 (109.8)
Mean daily maximum °C (°F)	7.1 (44.8)	8.6 (47.5)	13.2 (55.8)	16.8 (62.2)	20.6 (69.1)	24.6 (76.3)	27.0 (80.6)	27.1 (80.8)	22.4 (72.3)	17.0 (62.6)	11.0 (51.8)	7.6 (45.7)	16.9 (62.4)
Daily mean °C (°F)	3.9 (39.0)	4.6 (40.3)	8.0 (46.4)	10.9 (51.6)	14.7 (58.5)	18.5 (65.3)	20.6 (69.1)	20.5 (68.9)	16.3 (61.3)	12.4 (54.3)	7.4 (45.3)	4.5 (40.1)	11.9 (53.4)
Mean daily minimum °C (°F)	0.8 (33.4)	0.6 (33.1)	2.7 (36.9)	4.9 (40.8)	8.9 (48.0)	12.4 (54.3)	14.2 (57.6)	13.9 (57.0)	10.2 (50.4)	7.8 (46.0)	3.8 (38.8)	1.3 (34.3)	6.8 (44.2)
Record low °C (°F)	−21.0 (−5.8)	−19.0 (−2.2)	−12.0 (10.4)	−5.3 (22.5)	−1.2 (29.8)	2.2 (36.0)	5.0 (41.0)	3.0 (37.4)	−0.9 (30.4)	−6.8 (19.8)	−9.0 (15.8)	−15.2 (4.6)	−21.0 (−5.8)
Average precipitation mm (inches)	60.1 (2.37)	49.5 (1.95)	51.9 (2.04)	64.9 (2.56)	81.1 (3.19)	70.8 (2.79)	67.6 (2.66)	63.5 (2.50)	67.6 (2.66)	70.6 (2.78)	83.0 (3.27)	65.1 (2.56)	795.7 (31.33)
Average precipitation days (≥ 1.0 mm)	12.0	10.2	9.7	10.6	11.3	8.8	7.9	7.9	8.3	11.1	13.0	12.6	123.4
Source: Meteociel

== See also ==
- Moulins Cathedral
- Diocese of Moulins
- AS Moulins
- Communes of the Allier department
- Moulins Ball
