= La Vérité (Shanghai) =

La Vérité ('The Truth') was a French language radical socialist weekly newspaper published from Shanghai. It was founded in 1931 by P. Destrées (a French lawyer, who had arrived in China from Paris a short time before the launching). La Vérité immediately stirred up a lot of controversy in the Shanghai French Concession, as it continuously attacked the French Chief of Police, Captain Fiori, and other public officials for inaction in curbing gambling in the area. The contemporary China Weekly Review labelled the publication 'spicy'.
