= Radio Verite =

Programming
- Languages: French and Haitian Creole

Links
- Website: radioverite.com

Radio Verite is a Haitian radio station based out of East Orange, New Jersey that provides news on politics, and social policies. It also has a Christian format as a number of local Haitian Pentecostal ministers host shows and religious content in French and Haitian Creole.
