= Cinéma vérité (disambiguation) =

Cinéma vérité is a documentary film-making style combining naturalistic techniques with stylized cinematic devices.

Cinéma vérité may refer to:

- Cinema Verite (2011 film), a film by HBO Films about the making of the television series An American Family
- Cinéma Vérité (album), the first album by alternative rock group Dramarama
- Cinéma Vérité (film festival), an Iranian documentary film festival
- Cinéma Vérité: Defining the Moment, a 1999 documentary film

== See also ==
- Cinema Verity, a defunct British production company
- Kino-Pravda, or Cinema Truth, a Russian film series
