= The Ant and the Grasshopper =

Aesop's fable about the virtues of hard work and forethought

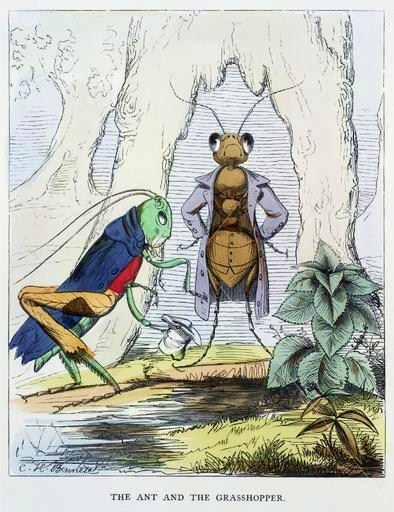
- The Grasshopper begs at the Ant's door. Art by Charles H. Bennett (1857).

Folk tale
- Name: The Ant and the Grasshopper
- Also known as: The Grasshopper and the Ant (373 in Perry Index of Fables)
- Aarne–Thompson grouping: ATU 280A (The Ant and the Cricket)
- Region: Greece
- Published in: Aesop's Fables, by Aesop

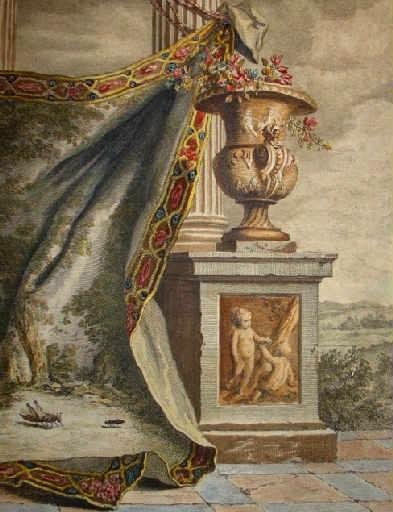
Coloured print of La Fontaine's fable by Jean-Baptiste Oudry, c. 1750

The Ant and the Grasshopper, alternatively titled The Grasshopper and the Ant (or Ants), is one of Aesop's Fables, numbered 373 in the Perry Index. The fable describes how a hungry grasshopper begs for food from an ant when winter comes and is refused. The situation sums up moral lessons about the virtues of hard work and planning for the future.

Even in Classical times, however, the advice was mistrusted by some and an alternative story represented the ant's industry as mean and self-serving. Jean de la Fontaine's delicately ironic retelling in French later widened the debate to cover the themes of compassion and charity. Since the 18th century the grasshopper has been seen as the type of the artist and the question of the place of culture in society has also been included. Argument over the fable's ambivalent meaning has generally been conducted through adaptation or reinterpretation of the fable in literature, arts, and music.

== Fable and counter-fable ==
The fable concerns a grasshopper (in the original, a cicada) that has spent the summer singing and dancing while the ant (or ants in some versions) worked to store up food for winter. When winter arrives, the grasshopper finds itself dying of hunger and begs the ant for food. However, the ant rebukes its idleness and tells it to dance the winter away now. Versions of the fable are found in the verse collections of Babrius (140) and Avianus (34), and in several prose collections including those attributed to Syntipas and Aphthonius of Antioch. The fable's Greek original cicada is kept in the Latin and Romance translations. A variant fable, separately numbered 112 in the Perry Index, features a dung beetle as the improvident insect which finds that the winter rains wash away the dung on which it feeds.

The fable is found in a large number of mediaeval Latin sources and also figures as a moral ballade among the poems of Eustache Deschamps under the title of La fourmi et le céraseron. From the start it assumes prior knowledge of the fable and presents human examples of provident and improvident behaviour as typified by the insects. As well as appearing in vernacular collections of Aesop's fables in Renaissance times, a number of Neo-Latin poets used it as a subject, including Gabriele Faerno (1563), Hieronymus Osius (1564) and Candidus Pantaleon (1604).

The story has been used to teach the virtues of hard work and the perils of improvidence. Some versions state a moral at the end along the lines of "An idle soul shall suffer hunger", "Work today to eat tomorrow", and "July is follow'd by December". In La Fontaine's Fables no final judgment is made, although it has been argued that the author is there making sly fun of his own notoriously improvident ways. But the point of view in most retellings of the fable is supportive of the ant, a point of view influenced by the commendation in the biblical Book of Proverbs, which mentions the ant twice. The first proverb admonishes, "Go to the ant, you sluggard! Consider her ways and be wise, which having no captain, overseer or ruler, provides her supplies in the summer, and gathers her food in the harvest" (6.6–8). Later, in a parallel saying of Agur, the insects figure among the 'four things that are little upon the earth but they are exceeding wise. The ants are a people not strong, yet they provide their food in the summer.' (30.24–25)

There was, nevertheless, an alternative tradition also ascribed to Aesop in which the ant was seen as a bad example. This appears as a counter-fable and is numbered 166 in the Perry Index. It relates that the ant was once a man who was always busy farming. Not satisfied with the results of his own labour, he plundered his neighbours' crops at night. This angered the king of the gods, who turned him into what is now an ant. Yet even though the man had changed his shape, he did not change his habits and to this day goes around the fields gathering the fruits of other people's labour, storing them up for himself. The moral given the fable in old Greek sources was that it is easier to change in appearance than to change one's moral nature. It has rarely been noticed since Classical times. Among the few prominent collectors of fables who recorded it later were Gabriele Faerno (1564), and Roger L'Estrange (1692). The latter's comment is that the ant's "Vertue and Vice, in many Cases, are hardly Distinguishable but by the Name".

== In art ==
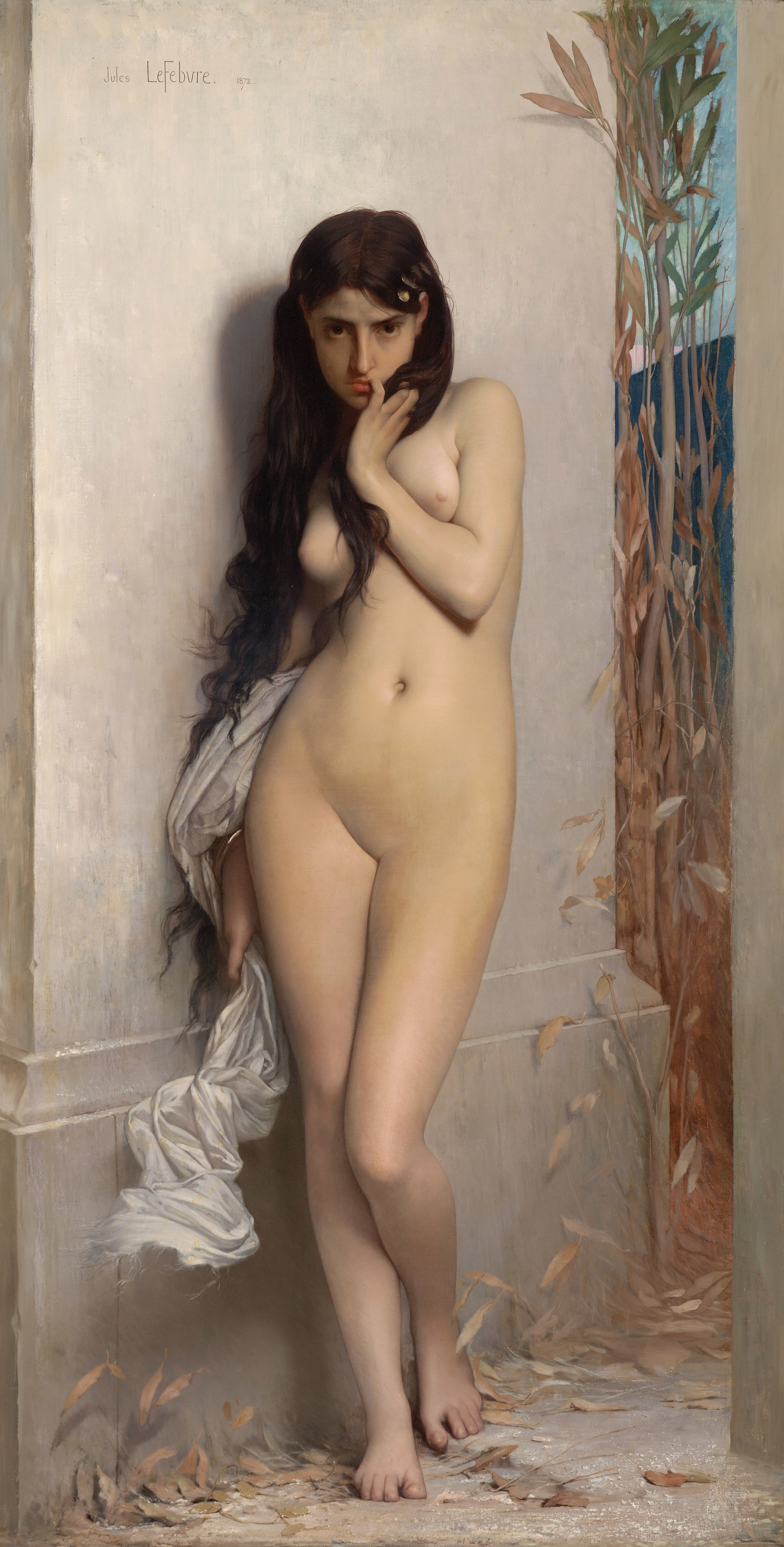
Jules-Joseph Lefebvre, The Grasshopper (1872), National Gallery of Victoria, Australia

Because of the influence of La Fontaine's Fables, in which La cigale et la fourmi stands at the beginning, the grasshopper then became the proverbial example of improvidence in France: so much so that Jules-Joseph Lefebvre (1836–1911) could paint a picture of a female nude biting one of her nails among the falling leaves and be sure viewers would understand the point by giving it the title La Cigale. The painting was exhibited at the 1872 Salon with a quotation from La Fontaine, Quand la bise fut venue (When the north wind blew), and was seen as a critique of the lately deposed Napoleon III, who had led the nation into a disastrous war with Prussia. Another with the same title, alternatively known as "Girl with a Mandolin" (1890), was painted by Edouard Bisson (1856–1939) and depicts a Romani musician in a sleeveless dress shivering in the falling snow. Also so-named is the painting by Henrietta Rae (a student of Lefebvre's) of a naked girl with a mandolin slung over her back who is cowering among the falling leaves at the root of a tree.

The grasshopper and the ant are generally depicted as women because both words for the insects are of the feminine gender in most Romance languages. Picturing the grasshopper as a musician, generally carrying a mandolin or guitar, was a convention that grew up when the insect was portrayed as a human being, since singers accompanied themselves on those instruments. The sculptor and painter Ignaz Stern (1679–1748) also has the grasshopper thinly clad and shivering in the paired statues he produced under the title of the fable, while the jovial ant is more warmly dressed. But the anticlerical painter Jehan Georges Vibert has male characters in his picture of "La cigale et la fourmi" from 1875. It is painted as a mediaeval scene in which a minstrel with a tall lute on his back encounters a monk on a snow-covered upland. The warmly shrouded monk has been out gathering alms and may be supposed to be giving the musician a lecture on his improvidence. By contrast, the Naturalist Victor-Gabriel Gilbert (1847–1933) pictures the fable as being enacted in the marketplace of a small town in Northern France. An elderly stall-keeper is frowning at a decrepit woman who has paused nearby, while her younger companion looks on in distress. In his lithograph from the Volpini Suite, "Les cigales et les fourmis" (1889), Paul Gauguin avoids making a judgment. Subtitled 'a souvenir of Martinique', it pictures a group of women sitting or lying on the ground while in the background other women walk past with baskets on their heads. He is content that they exemplify the behaviour proverbially assigned to the insects without moral comment.

For a long time, the illustrators of fable books had tended to concentrate on picturing winter landscapes, with the encounter between the insects occupying only the lower foreground. In the 19th century the insects grew in size and began to take on human dress. It was this tendency that was reproduced in that curiosity of publishing, the 1894 Choix de Fables de La Fontaine, Illustrée par un Groupe des Meilleurs Artistes de Tokio, which was printed in Japan and illustrated by some of the foremost woodblock artists of the day. Kajita Hanko's treatment of the story takes place in a typical snowy landscape with the cricket approaching a thatched cottage, watched through a window by the robed ant. An earlier Chinese treatment, commissioned mid-century by Baron Félix-Sébastien Feuillet de Conches through his diplomatic contacts, uses human figures to depict the situation. An old woman in a ragged dress approaches the lady of the house, who is working at her spinning wheel on an open verandah.

Use of the insects to point a moral lesson extends into the 20th century. In Jean Vernon's bronze medal from the 1930s, the supplicant cicada is depicted as crouching on a branch while the ant rears up below with its legs about a beechnut. Engraved to one side is its sharp reply, Vous chantiez, j'en suis fort aise./ Eh bien, dansez maintenant. (You sang? I'm glad; now you can dance.) Jacob Lawrence depicts much the same scene in his 1969 ink drawing of the fable, but with a different moral intent. There a weeping grasshopper stands before a seated ant who reaches back to lock his storeroom door. It is notable that artistic sentiment has by now moved against the ant with the recognition that improvidence is not always the only cause of poverty.

Nevertheless, Hungary used the fable to promote a savings campaign on a 60 forint stamp in 1958.

The following year, it appeared again in a series depicting fairy tales, as it did as one of many pendents? on a 1.50 tögrög stamp from Mongolia. In this case the main stamp was commemorating the 1970 World's Fair in Japan with a picture of the Sumitomo fairy tale pavilion.

== Later adaptations ==
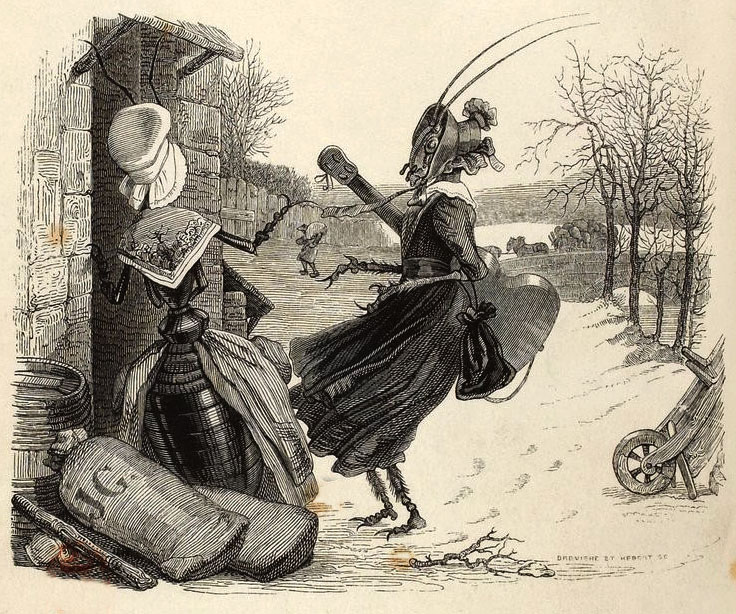
Wood engraving of the fable by J. J. Grandville, 1838–1840

La Fontaine's portrayal of the Ant as a flawed character, reinforced by the ambivalence of the alternative fable, led to that insect too being viewed as anything but an example of virtue. Jules Massenet's two-act ballet Cigale, first performed at the Opéra-Comique in Paris in 1904, portrays the cicada as a charitable woman who takes pity on "La Pauvrette" (the poor little one). But La Pauvrette, after being taken in and fed, is rude and heartless when the situation is reversed. Cigale is left to die in the snow at the close of the ballet.

La Fontaine's poem has also been subverted by several French parodies. In Joseph Autran's Réhabilitation de la fourmi, the ant, while only having straw to eat himself, agrees to share his stocks with the cicada, so long as she sings him a song that would remind them of the summer, which, to him, will be more than worth the price. Tristan Corbière's A Marcelle – le poete et la cigale is a light-hearted literary criticism of a bad poet. In the 20th century, Jean Anouilh uses it as the basis for two almost independent fables. In La fourmi et la cigale the ant becomes an overworked housewife whom the dust follows into the grave. The cicada's comment is that she prefers to employ a maid. In La Cigale, Anouilh engages with the reality of the artistic life, reviewing the cicada as the type of the female musician. In this fable she figures as a night-club singer who asks a fox to act as her agent. He believes that she will be an easy victim for his manipulations but she handles him with such frosty finesse that he takes up singing himself. Pierre Perret's 1990 version in urban slang satirises the cicada's more traditional role as a thoughtless 'queen of the hit parade'. The subversion lies in the four-line moral at the end, in which he advises that it is better to be an impresario than a performer.

Roland Bacri takes the tale into fresh territory with his Fable Electorale. An unelected politician out of funds visits the ant and, on being asked what he did during the past election, replied that he sang the national anthem. Playing on the final words of La Fontaine's fable (Eh bien, dansez maintenant), the industrialist advises him to stand for president (presidensez maintenant). On the other hand, Francoise Sagan turns the satire against the too industrious. Her ant has been stockpiling all winter and urges the grasshopper to invest in her wares when spring comes. But the grasshopper's needs are few and she advises holding a discount sale instead. To take a final example, the Anti-Cancer League has turned the fable into an attack on smoking. The grasshopper's appeal, out of pocket and desperate for a cigarette, is turned down by another play on the original ending. So, she had smoked all through the summer? OK, now cough (Et bien, toussez).

The English writer W. Somerset Maugham reverses the moral order in a different way in his short story, "The Ant and The Grasshopper" (1924). It concerns two brothers, one of whom is a dissolute waster whose hard-working brother has constantly to bail out of difficulties. At the end the latter is enraged to discover that his 'grasshopper' brother has married a rich widow, who then dies and leaves him a fortune. The story was later adapted in the film Encore (1951) and the English television series Somerset Maugham Hour (1960). James Joyce also adapts the fable into a tale of brotherly conflict in "The Ondt and the Gracehoper" episode in Finnegans Wake (1939) and makes of the twin brothers Shem and Shaun opposing tendencies within the human personality:

These twain are the twins that tick Homo Vulgaris.

In America, John Ciardi's poetical fable for children, "John J. Plenty and Fiddler Dan" (1963), makes an argument for poetry over fanatical hard work. Ciardi's ant, John J. Plenty, is so bent upon saving that he eats very little of what he has saved. Meanwhile, Fiddler Dan the grasshopper and his non-conforming ant wife survive the winter without help and resume playing music with the return of spring.

Ambrose Bierce has two variant of the tale in his Fantastic Fable. In the first, "The Grasshopper and the Ant", after the ant asks the grasshopper why it didn't make any stocks, it replies that it actually did, but the ants broke in and took them all away. In another, "The Ants and the Grasshopper", the grasshopper is a miner who was too busy digging to prepare, while the ants are replaced by politicians, for whom it is his work which is "profitless amusement".

John Updike's 1987 short story "Brother Grasshopper" deals with a pair of brothers-in-law whose lives parallel the fable of the ant and the grasshopper. One, Fred Barrow, lives a conservative, restrained existence; the other, Carlyle Lothrop, spends his money profligately, especially on joint vacations for the two men's families, even as he becomes financially insolvent. However, at the end comes an unexpected inversion of the characters' archetypal roles. When Carlyle dies, Fred, now divorced and lonely, realizes that he has been left with a rich store of memories which would not have existed without his friend's largesse.

"Revolution" (La Rivoluzione), a poem by the Italian Communist writer Gianni Rodari, offers an alternative political moral by cutting through the debate over duty, compassion, and utilitarianism that has been the legacy of La Fontaine's fable. He describes simply seeing an ant give half of his provisions to a cicada. Such generosity is the true revolution! In Dmitry Bykov's poem "Fable" (Басня) the grasshopper is perishing from cold and dreams that in Heaven the ant will someday ask her to let him share in her dance, to which she'll answer "Go and work!"

== Musical settings ==
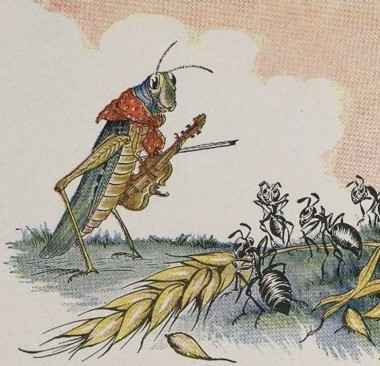
1919 illustration of Aesop's Fables by Milo Winter

La Fontaine's version of the fable was set by the following French composers:

- Louis-Nicolas Clérambault, to whom the works in the fables section of Nouvelles poésies spirituelles et morales sur les plus beaux airs (1730–37) have been attributed. The text is modified to fit the tune and is retitled La fourmi et la sauterelle.
- Jacques Offenbach in Six Fables de La Fontaine (1842) for soprano and small orchestra
- Charles Gounod, part-song for a cappella choir (1857)
- Benjamin Godard, the second of Six Fables de La Fontaine for voice and piano, (Op.17 1872/9)
- Eugenie Santa Coloma Sourget for high voice and piano (1881).
- Louis Lacombe, set for 4 male voices (Op. 88,2 1887)
- Charles Lecocq in Six Fables de Jean de la Fontaine for voice and piano (1900)
- Camille Saint-Saëns in La cigale et la fourmi for voice and piano or orchestra (circa 1860s)
- André Caplet in Trois Fables de Jean de la Fontaine (1919) for voice and piano
- Paul-Marie Masson, for voice and piano (1926)
- Maurice Delage in Deux fables de Jean de la Fontaine (1931)
- Marcelle de Manziarly in Trois Fables de La Fontaine (1935) for voice and piano
- Jean-René Quignard for 2 children's voices
- Charles Trenet, performed with Django Reinhardt and the Hot Club de France in 1941
- Marie-Madeleine Duruflé as the fifth in her 6 Fables de La Fontaine for A cappella female voices (1960)
- Claude Ballif, the first of his Chansonettes : 5 Fables de La Fontaine for small mixed choir (Op. 72, Nº1 1995)
- Ida Gotkovsky, the first fable in Hommage à Jean de La Fontaine for mixed choirs and orchestra (1995)
- Jean-Marie Morel (1934–), a small cantata set for children's choir and string quartet in La Fontaine en chantant (1999)
- Isabelle Aboulker, the fourth piece in Femmes en fables (1999) for high voice with piano
- Vladimir Cosma, the first piece in Eh bien ! Dansez maintenant (2006), a light-hearted interpretation for narrator and orchestra in the style of a gavotte.

There were two comic operas that went under the title La cigale et la fourmi in the 19th century. The one by Ferdinand Poise was in one act and dated 1870. The one by Edmond Audran was in three acts and performed in Paris in 1886, in London in 1890 and in New York in 1891. This was shortly followed by the darker mood of Jules Massenet's ballet Cigale, mentioned above. Later adaptations of the fable to ballet include Henri Sauguet's La cigale at la fourmi (1941) and the third episode in Francis Poulenc's Les Animaux modèles (Model Animals, 1941). In the 21st century there has been "La C et la F de la F", in which the dancers interact with the text, choreographed by Herman Diephuis for Annie Sellem's composite presentation of the fables in 2004. It also figures among the four in the film Les Fables à la Fontaine directed by Marie-Hélène Rebois in 2004.

The Belgian composer Joseph Jongen set La Fontaine's fable for children's chorus and piano (op. 118, 1941) and the Dutch composer Rudolf Koumans set the French text in Vijf fabels van La Fontaine (op. 25, 1964) for school chorus and orchestra. There is a happier ending in the American composer Shawn Allen's children's opera, The Ant and the Grasshopper (1999). At the end of this thirty-minute work, the two insects become musical partners during the winter after the ant revives the dying grasshopper.

Ivan Krylov's variant of the fable was set for voice and piano by Anton Rubinstein in 1851; a German version (Der Ameise und die Libelle) was later published in Leipzig in 1864 as part of his Fünf Fabeln (Op.64). In the following century the Russian text was again set by Dmitri Shostakovich in Two Fables of Krylov for mezzo-soprano, female chorus and chamber orchestra (op.4, 1922). A Hungarian translation of the fable by Dezső Kosztolányi was also set for mezzo-soprano, four-part mixed chorus and 4 guitars or piano by Ferenc Farkas in 1977. The Catalan composer Xavier Benguerel i Godó set the fable in his 7 Fábulas de la Fontaine for recitation with orchestra in 1995. These used a Catalan translation by his father, the writer Xavier Benguerel i Llobet.

There have also been purely instrumental pieces; these include the first of Antal Dorati's 5 Pieces for Oboe (1980) and the first of Karim Al-Zand's Four Fables for flute, clarinet and piano (2003).

Settings of the Aesop version have been much rarer. It was among Mabel Wood Hill's Aesop's Fables Interpreted Through Music (New York, 1920). It was also included among David Edgar Walther's 'short operatic dramas' in 2009. In 2010 Lefteris Kordis set the Greek text as the second fable in his "Aesop Project" for octet and voice.

== Moral and artistic debate ==
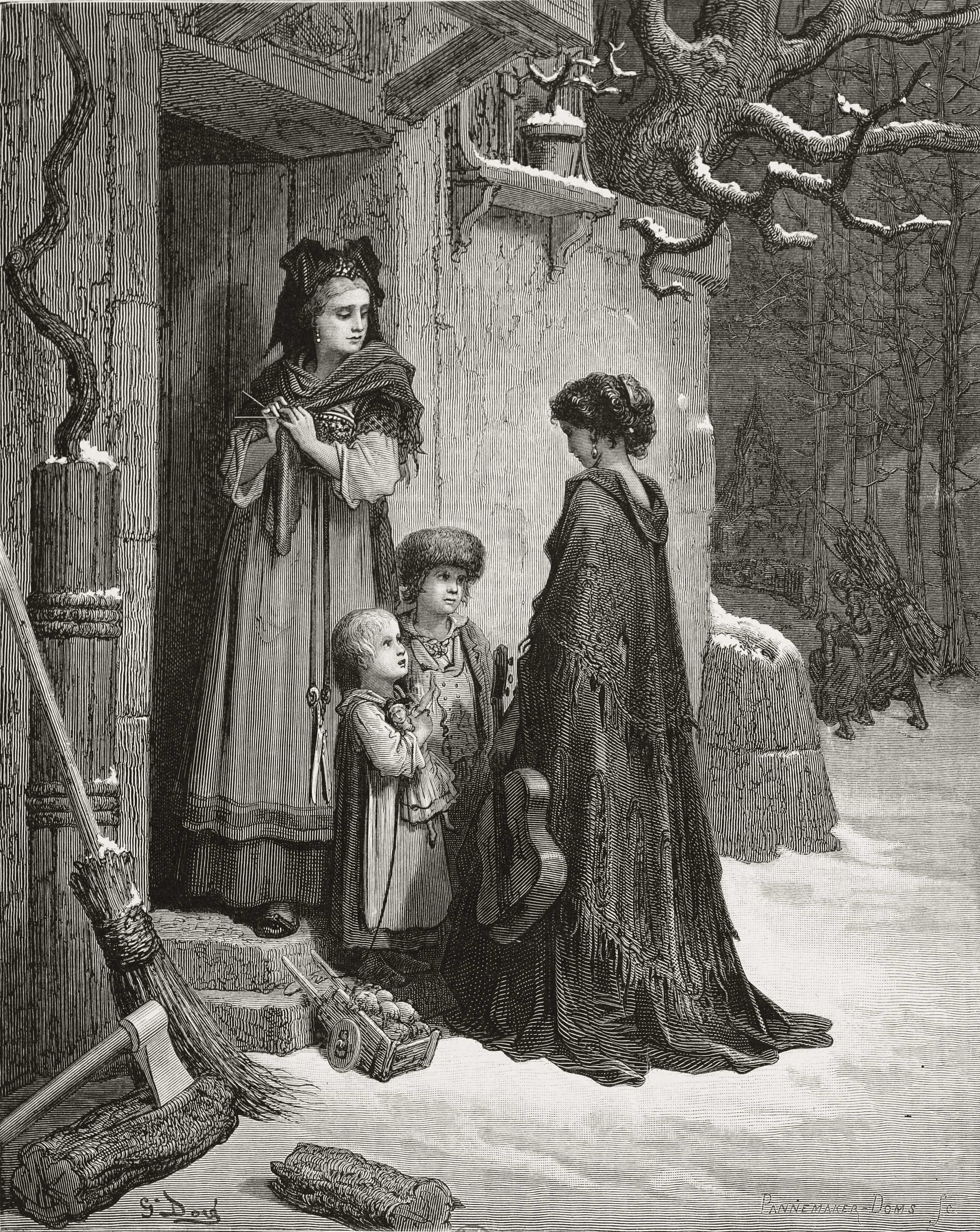
Gustave Doré illustration of La Fontaine's The Ant and the Grasshopper

La Fontaine follows ancient sources in his 17th-century retelling of the fable, where the ant suggests at the end that since the grasshopper has sung all summer she should now dance for its entertainment. However, his only direct criticism of the ant is that it lacked generosity. The Grasshopper had asked for a loan which it promised to pay back with interest, but "The Ant had a failing,/She wasn't a lender".

The readers of his time were aware of the Christian duty of charity and therefore sensed the moral ambiguity of the fable. This is further brought out by Gustave Doré's 1880s print which pictures the story as a human situation. A female musician stands at a door in the snow with the children of the house looking up at her with sympathy. Their mother looks down from the top of the steps. Her tireless industry is indicated by the fact that she continues knitting but, in a country where the knitting-women (les tricoteuses) had jeered at the victims of the guillotine during the French Revolution, this activity would also have been associated with lack of pity.

Other French fabulists since La Fontaine had already started the counter-attack on the self-righteous ant. In around 1800 Jean-Jacques Boisard has the cricket answering the ant's criticism of his enjoyment of life with the philosophical proposition that since we must all die in the end, Hoarding is folly, enjoyment is wise. In a Catholic educational work (Fables, 1851) Jacques-Melchior Villefranche offers a sequel in which the ant loses its stores and asks the bee for help. The ant's former taunt to the grasshopper is now turned on himself:

Are you hungry? Well then,
Turn a pirouette,
Dine on a mazurka,
Have polka for supper.

But then the bee reveals that it has already given the grasshopper shelter and invites the ant to join him since 'All who are suffering/Deserve help equally.'

La Fontaine's fable also had a number of translations into Russian, in most of which the word used for the grasshopper is strekoza. Though that word means a dragonfly today, at the time it could be used for a grasshopper as well. Ivan Krylov's best known "The Grasshopper and the Ant" (Strekoza i muravej, 1808) follows the French original closely, but in the 1782 variant by Ivan Chemnitzer, simply titled "The Grasshopper", there is an alternative ending. This comments on the ant's final words that they were only spoken for the sake of teaching the grasshopper a lesson, after which the ant really did feed the grasshopper out of pity.

In the 20th century the fable entered the political arena. Walt Disney's cartoon version, The Grasshopper and the Ants (1934) confronts the dilemma of how to deal with improvidence from the point of view of Franklin D. Roosevelt's New Deal. The Grasshopper's irresponsibility is underlined by his song "The World Owes us a Living", which later that year became a Shirley Temple hit, rewritten to encase the story of the earlier cartoon. In the end the ants take pity on the grasshopper on certain conditions. The Queen of the Ants decrees that the grasshopper may stay, but he must play his fiddle in return for his room and board. He agrees to this arrangement, finally learning that he needs to make himself useful, and 'changes his tune' to

Oh I owe the world a living....
You ants were right the time you said
You've got to work for all you get.

In recent times, the fable has again been put to political use by both sides in the social debate between the enterprise culture and those who consider the advantaged have a responsibility towards the disadvantaged. A modern satirical version of the story, originally written in 1994, has the grasshopper calling a press conference at the beginning of the winter to complain about socio-economic inequity, and being given the ant's house. This version was written by Pittsburgh talk show guru Jim Quinn as an attack on the Clinton administration's social programme in the USA. In 2008 Conservative columnist Michelle Malkin also updated the story to satirize the policies of 'Barack Cicada'. There have been adaptations into other languages as well. But the commentary at the end of an Indian reworking explains such social conflict as the result of selective media presentation that exploits envy and fear.

The fable has equally been pressed into service in the debate over the artist's place within the work ethic. In Marie de France's mediaeval version the grasshopper had pleaded that its work was 'to sing and bring pleasure to all creatures, but I find none who will now return the same to me.' The ant's reply is thoroughly materialistic, however: 'Why should I give food to thee/When you cannot give aid to me?' At the end of the 15th century, Laurentius Abstemius makes a utilitarian point using different insects in his similar fable of the gnat and the bee. The gnat applies to the bee for food and shelter in winter and offers to teach her children music in return. The bee's reply is that she prefers to teach the children a useful trade that will preserve them from hunger and cold.

The fable of "A Gnat and a Bee" was later to be included by Thomas Bewick in his 1818 edition of Aesop's Fables. The conclusion he draws there is that 'The many unhappy people whom we see daily singing up and down in order to divert other people, though with very heavy hearts of their own, should warn all those who have the education of children how necessary it is to bring them up to industry and business, be their present prospects ever so hopeful.' The arts are no more highly regarded by the French revolutionary Pierre-Louis Ginguené whose "New Fables" (1810) include "The Grasshopper and the Other Insects". There the Grasshopper exhorts the others to follow his example of tireless artistic activity and is answered that the only justification for poetry can be if it is socially useful.

Such utilitarianism was soon to be challenged by Romanticism and its championship of the artist has coloured later attitudes. In the early decades of the 20th century, the Romanian poet George Topîrceanu was to make the case for pure artistic creation in "The ballad of a small grasshopper" (Balada unui greier mic), although more in the telling than by outright moralising. A cricket passes the summer in singing; autumn arrives, but he continues. It is only in icy winter that the cricket realizes that he hasn't provided for himself. He goes to his neighbour, the ant, to ask for something to eat, but the ant refuses saying, "You wasted your time all summer long." The English folk-singer and children's writer Leon Rosselson subtly turns the tables in much the same way in his 1970s song The Ant and the Grasshopper, using the story to rebuke the self-righteous ant (and those humans with his mindset) for letting his fellow creatures die of want and for his blindness to the joy of life.

In the field of children's literature, Slade and Toni Morrison's rap retelling of the fable, Who's Got Game?: The Ant or the Grasshopper? (2003), where the grasshopper represents the artisan, provokes a discussion about the importance of art. An earlier improvisation on the story that involves art and its value was written by the Silesian artist Janosch under the title "Die Fiedelgrille und der Maulwurf" (The fiddling cricket and the mole), originally published in 1982 and in English translation in 1983. There the cricket fiddles for the entertainment of the animals all summer but is rejected by the stag beetle and the mouse when winter comes. She eventually encounters the mole who loves her music, especially because he is blind, and invites her to stay with him.

The theme had been treated at an even further distance in Leo Lionni's Frederick (1967). Here a fieldmouse, in a community narrowly focused on efficiently gathering for the winter, concentrates instead on gathering impressions. When the other mice question the usefulness of this, Frederick insists that 'gathering sun rays for the cold dark winter days' is also work. Indeed, the community comes to recognise this after the food has run out and morale is low, when it is Frederick's poetry that raises their spirits.

== In philosophy ==
Bernard Suits' The Grasshopper: Games, Life and Utopia (1978) imagines a sequel to the fable in which the Grasshopper, on the verge of death in winter, defends his way of life to his followers. Written in the style of a Socratic dialogue, the Grasshopper gradually convinces his hesitant disciple, named Skepticus, that playing games is the ideal of existence. The Grasshopper is presented as an inhabitant of Utopia where all needs are satisfied, work has no value, and the only admirable pursuits are done for their own sake. The middle of the book consists in a long flashback in which the Grasshopper develops and defends a definition of a game as the voluntary attempt to overcome unnecessary obstacles. In the context of analytic philosophy, Suits contests Wittgenstein's view that games cannot be defined by common features and that all things relate only through family resemblance.

== See also ==
- The Fly and the Ant
- The Little Red Hen, a folk tale with a similar moral
