= The Death of Priam (Perrault) =

Painting by Léon Perrault

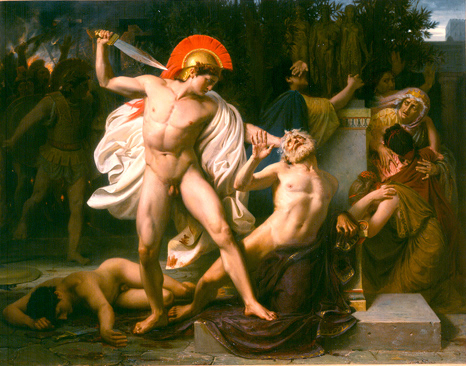
The Death of Priam (1861) by Léon Perrault

The Death of Priam is an 1861 oil on canvas painting by Léon Perrault. He entered it for the Prix de Rome but lost to Lefebvre's treatment of the same subject - both works depict Neoptolemus' murder of Priam as described in Virgil's Aeneid II, lines 509 to 516. Perrault's work is now in the École nationale supérieure des beaux-arts in Paris with inventory number MU 11709.
