= The Truth (Lefebvre) =

1870 painting by Jules Joseph Lefebvre

- La Vérité (French)
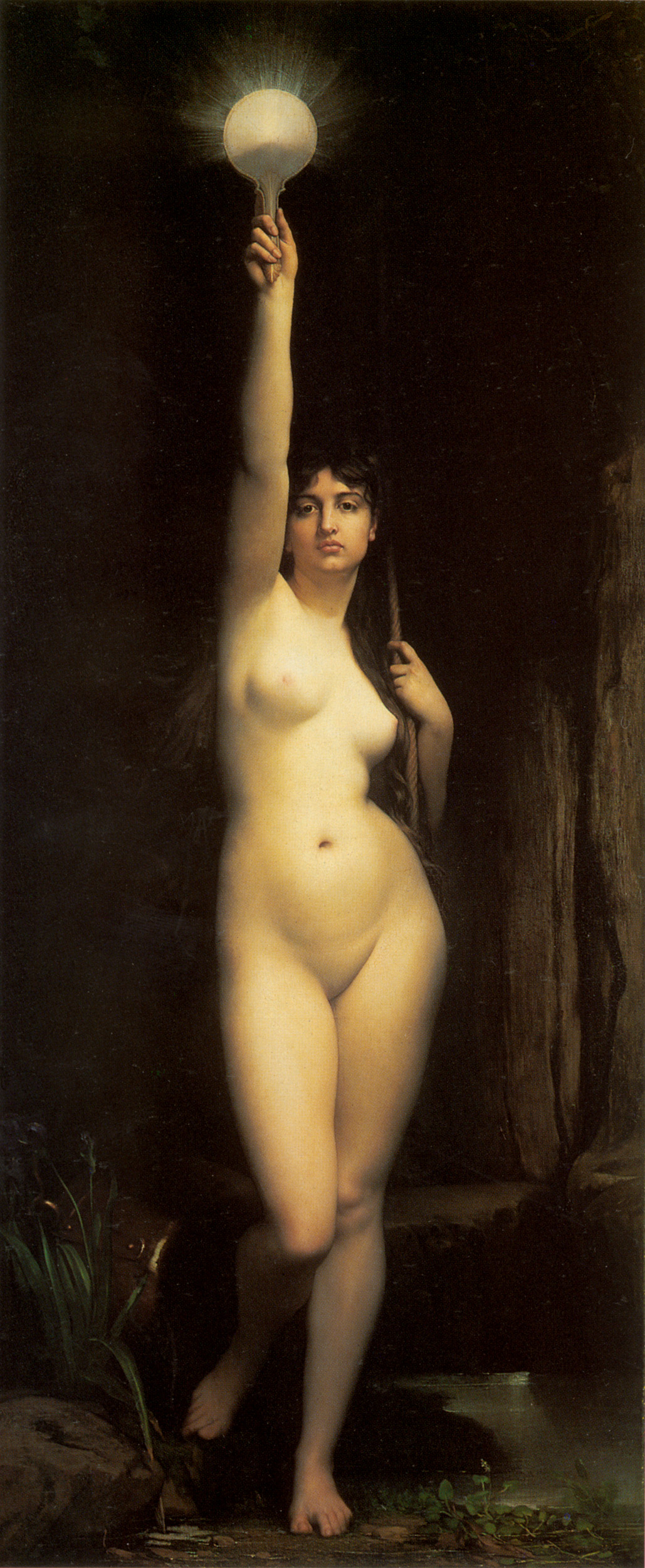
- Artist: Jules Joseph Lefebvre
- Year: 1870
- Medium: Oil on canvas
- Dimensions: 264 cm × 112 cm (104 in × 44 in)
- Location: Musée d'Orsay, Paris

The Truth is an 1870 oil-on-canvas painting by the French painter Jules Joseph Lefebvre. It is on display in the Musée d'Orsay, in Paris, where it has been displayed since 1982.

The Truth was exhibited during the 1870 Salon and was bought by the French state in 1871.

== Description ==
The painting depicts a naked woman standing in what appears to be a dark cave, facing the viewers. Her right hand extends above her head, holding a shining golden mirror, and her left holds onto a rope that continues into the dark above her. Her right leg is bent, shifting weight onto her left hip in a contrapposto pose, and as if she may be walking towards the viewers. A fallen bucket can be seen behind some plants near her right leg, and a body of water behind her. These, the background, and the rope she holds onto allude to that she may be in a well.

== Background and influence ==
Lefebvre's Truth appears to be the first instance of a motif of Truth personified as a nude woman holding a mirror in or emerging from a well, imagery which would also be used by other French artists in the late nineteenth century, most notably several works by Jean-Léon Gérôme (see Truth Coming Out of Her Well). It is seemingly derived from an aphorism by the Ancient Greek philosopher Democritus: "Of truth [aletheia] we know nothing, for truth is in a well."

The model for the painting was the well-known French actress Sophie Croizette. Although her career was primarily in theater, Croizette also modeled for several artists, most notably including her brother-in-law Carolus-Duran's Equestrian Portrait of Mademoiselle Croizette.

The painting is contemporary with the first small scale model made by Lefebvre's fellow-Frenchman Frédéric Bartholdi for what became the Statue of Liberty, striking a similar pose, though fully clothed.

== See also ==
- Aletheia
- Truth Coming Out of Her Well, a series of paintings with similar motifs
