= Diana Surprised =

Painting by Jules Joseph Lefebvre

- Diane surprise (French)
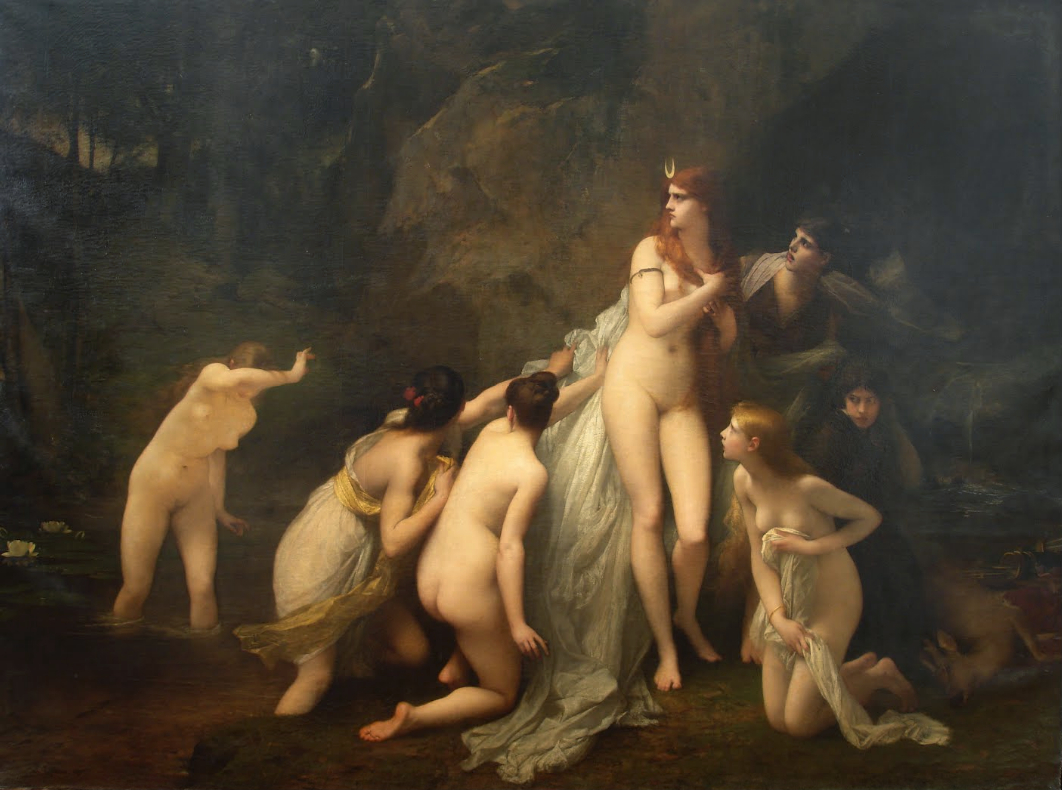
- Artist: Jules Joseph Lefebvre
- Year: 1879
- Type: Oil on canvas
- Dimensions: 279 cm × 371.5 cm (110 in × 146.3 in)
- Location: Museo Nacional de Bellas Artes, Buenos Aires

Diana Surprised (French: Diane surprise) is an 1879 oil painting by Jules Joseph Lefebvre. It depicts Diana and her attendants trying to cover themselves after being surprised while bathing naked. Lefebvre did not feel it was complete in time for the Exposition Universelle of 1878, but it was featured at the Salon of 1879 at the Louvre in Paris. Today it is in the collection of the Museo Nacional de Bellas Artes in Argentina.

The painting is 279cm by 371.5cm depicting the goddess Diana and her Nymphs bathing. The scene is from Ovid's Metamorphoses and depicts the moment where the hunter Actaeon stumbles upon Diana and her attendants. The painting was originally exhibited with a short poem written by Georges Lafenestre at the Salon of 1879.

== Bibliography ==
- Dimier, Louis (1914). Histoire de la peinture française au XIXe siècle (1793–1903) (in French). Delagrave.
- Norman, Geraldine (2023). Nineteenth Century Painters and Painting: A Dictionary. University of California Press.
- Parker, Shalon Detrice (2003). A Tradition Gone Awry: The Salon Nude in Fin-de-siècle France. University of California, Berkeley.
- Van Deurs, Adriana; Renard, Marcelo Gustavo (2002). Italian Sculpture at the National Museum of Fine Arts. Asociación Amigos del Museo Nacional de Bellas Artes.
