= Léon Perrault =

French painter

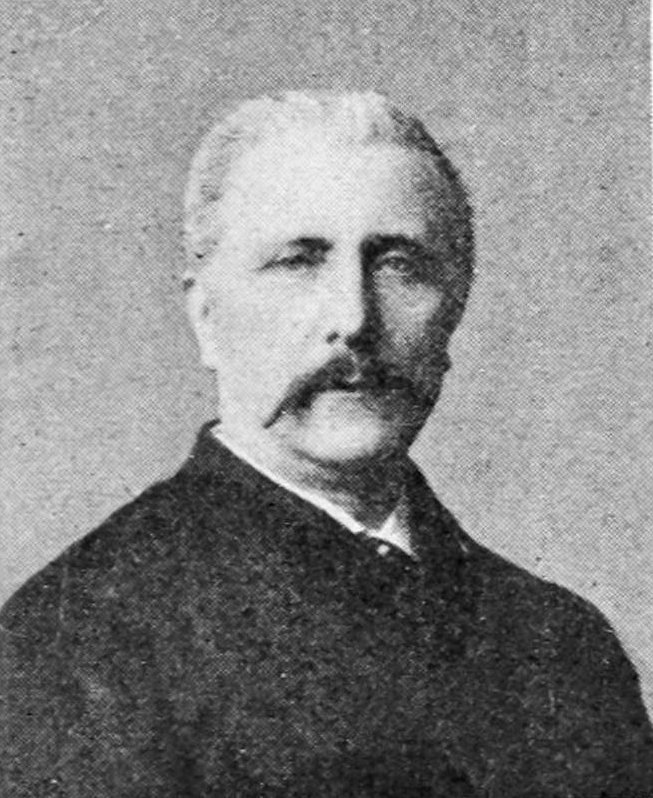
Léon Bazille Perrault

Léon-Jean-Bazille Perrault (French pronunciation: [leɔ̃ pɛʁo]; Poitiers 16 June 1832 – 1908 Royan) was a French academic painter.

== Biography ==
He was born to a modest family. A student of William Bouguereau and François-Edouard Picot, one of his earliest works is the 1861 The Death of Priam and he exhibited at the Salon from 1863 onwards, producing many genre works which were immensely popular. He was famous for his le petit naufragé (The little shipwrecked boy, 1874) and his paintings of children.

== Gallery ==
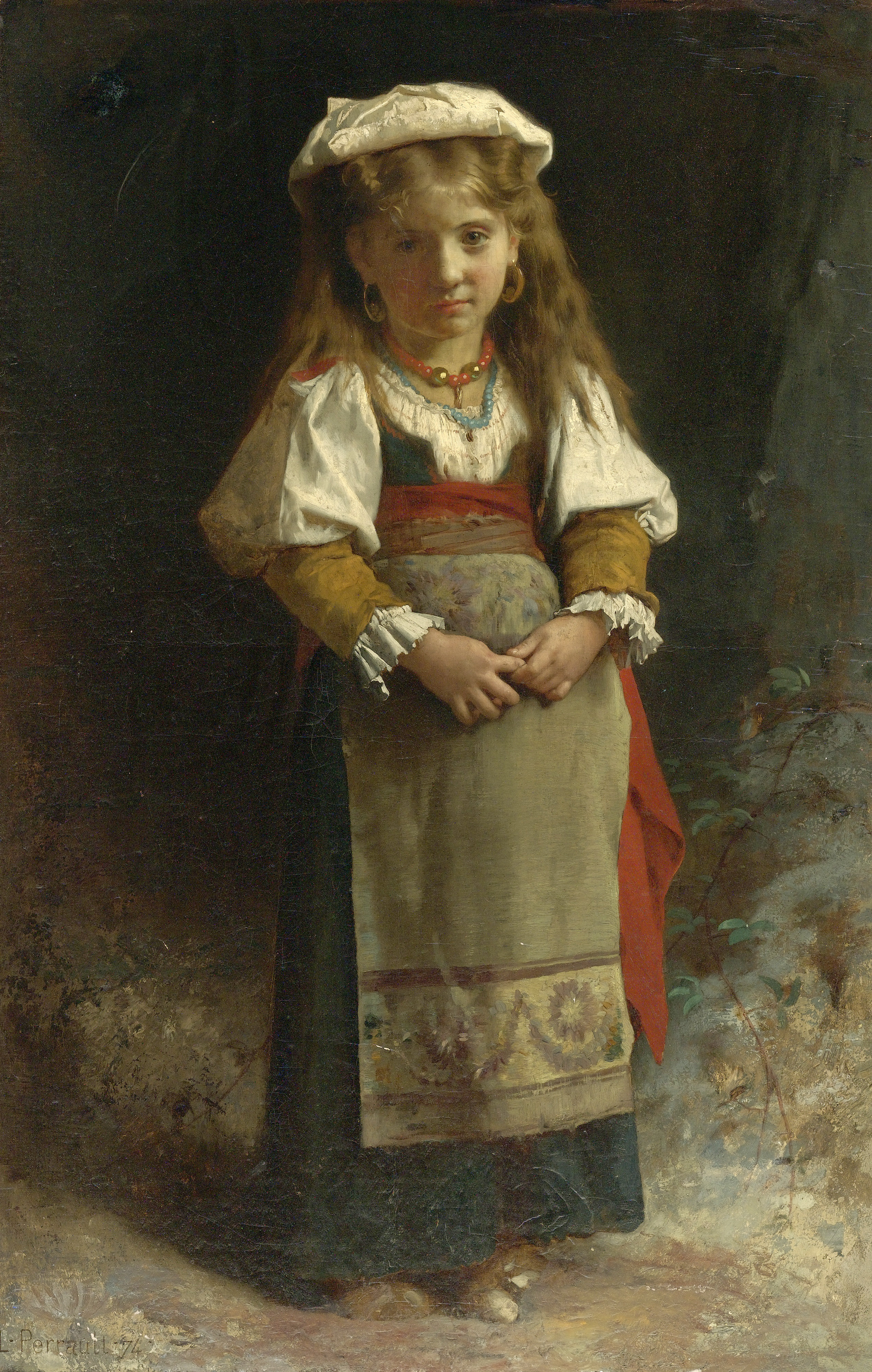
Portrait Of A Young Girl, 1874

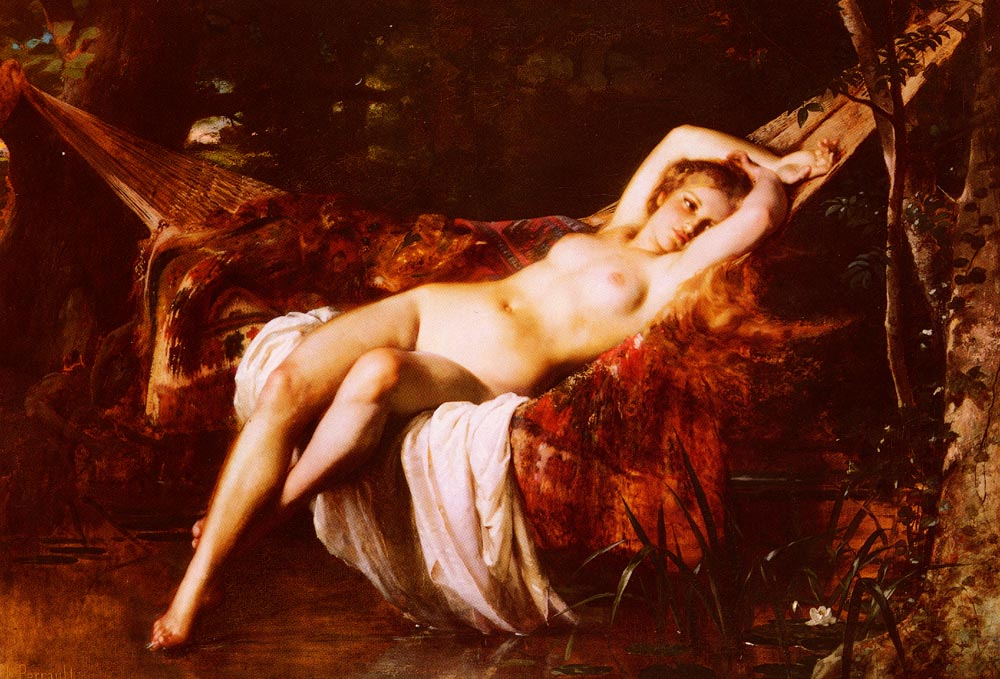
La Baigneuse, 1875

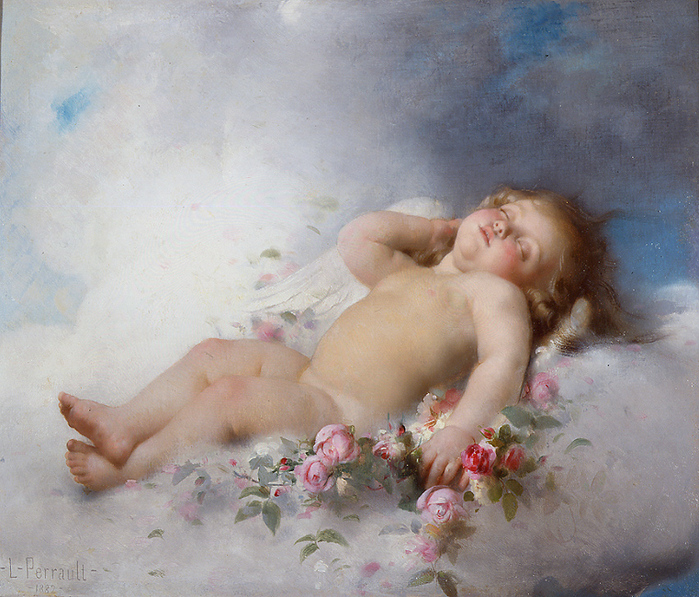
Sleeping Putto, 1882

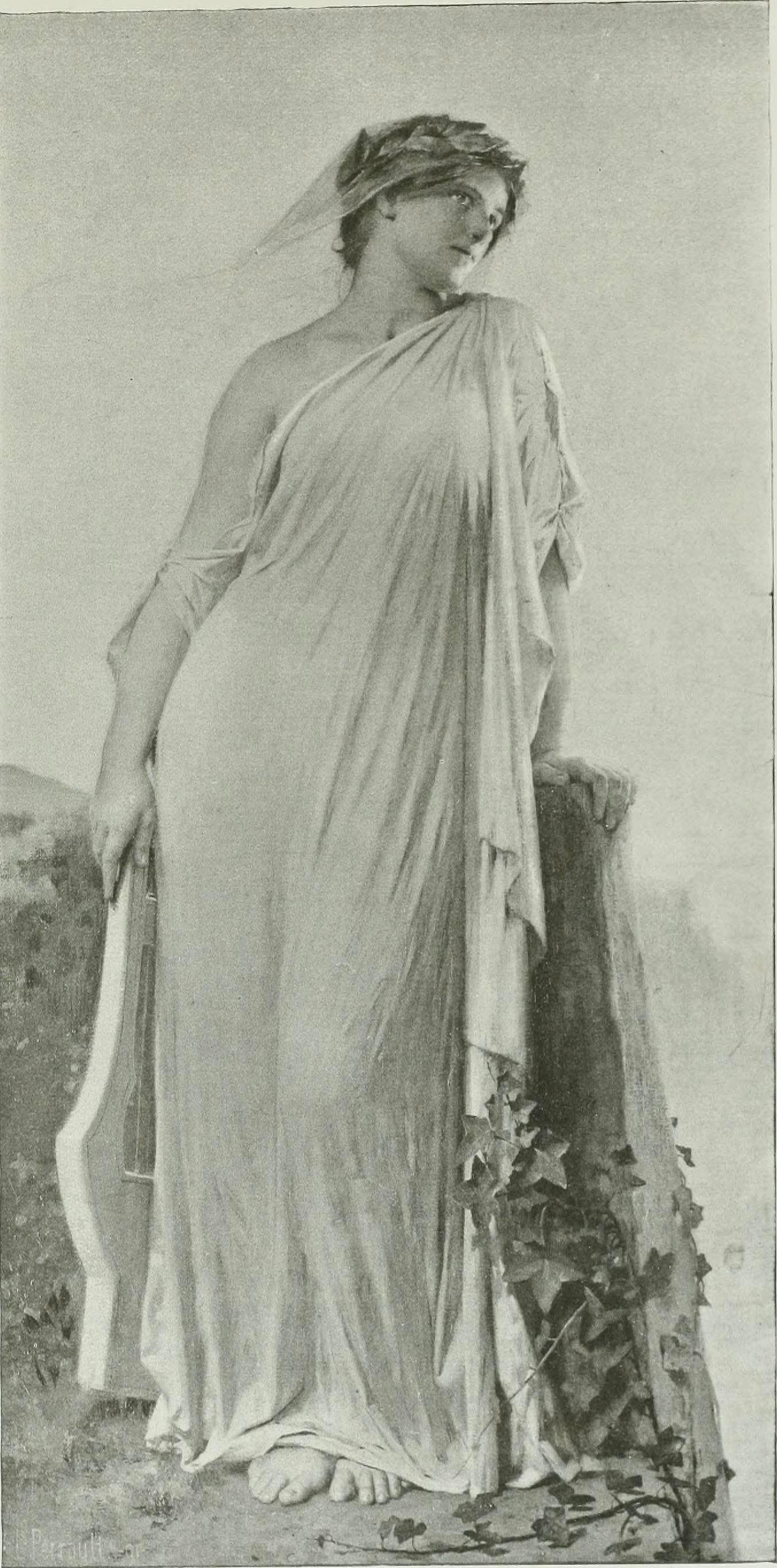
Sapho (Salon llustré 1891)

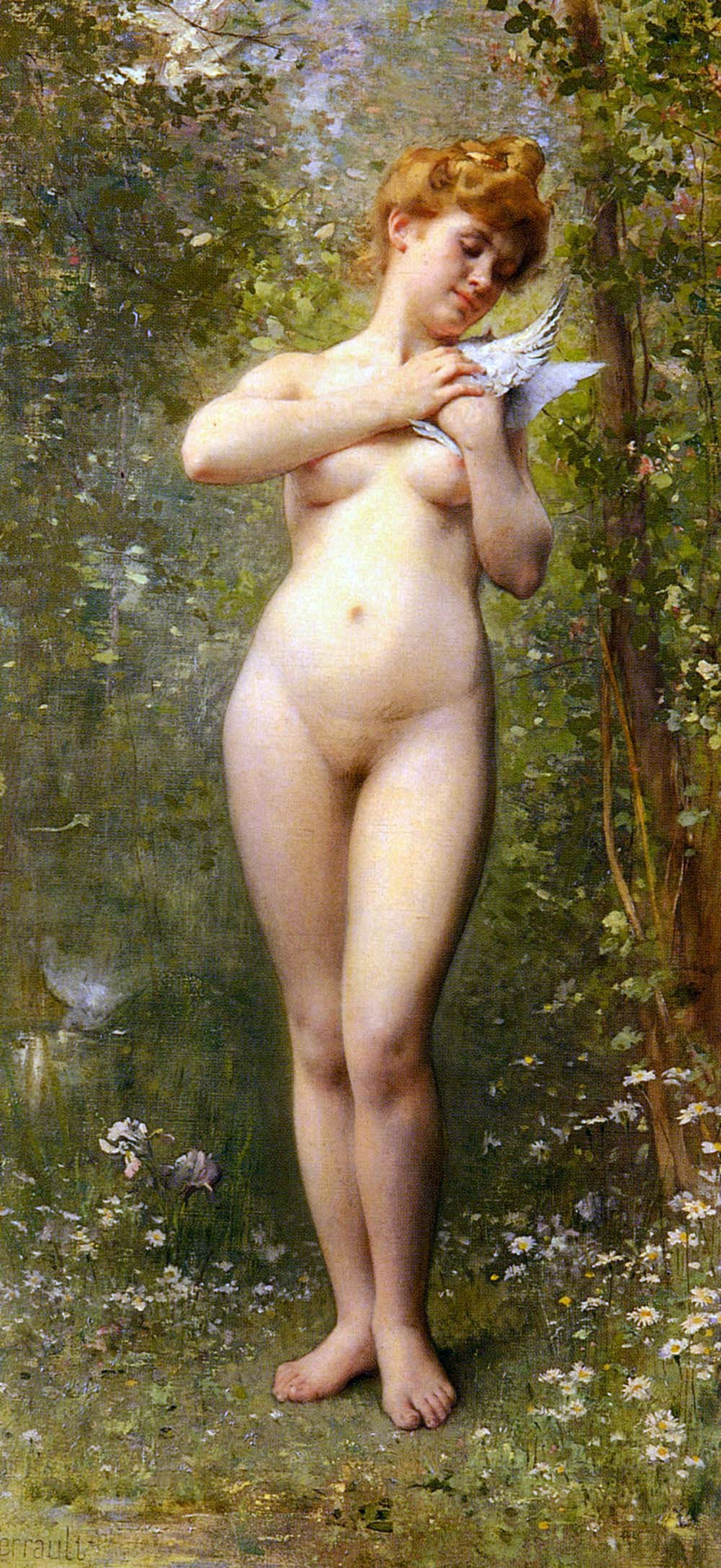
Vénus à la colombe, 1908
