= The Grasshopper (painting) =

Painting by Jules Joseph Lefebvre

- La Cigale (French)
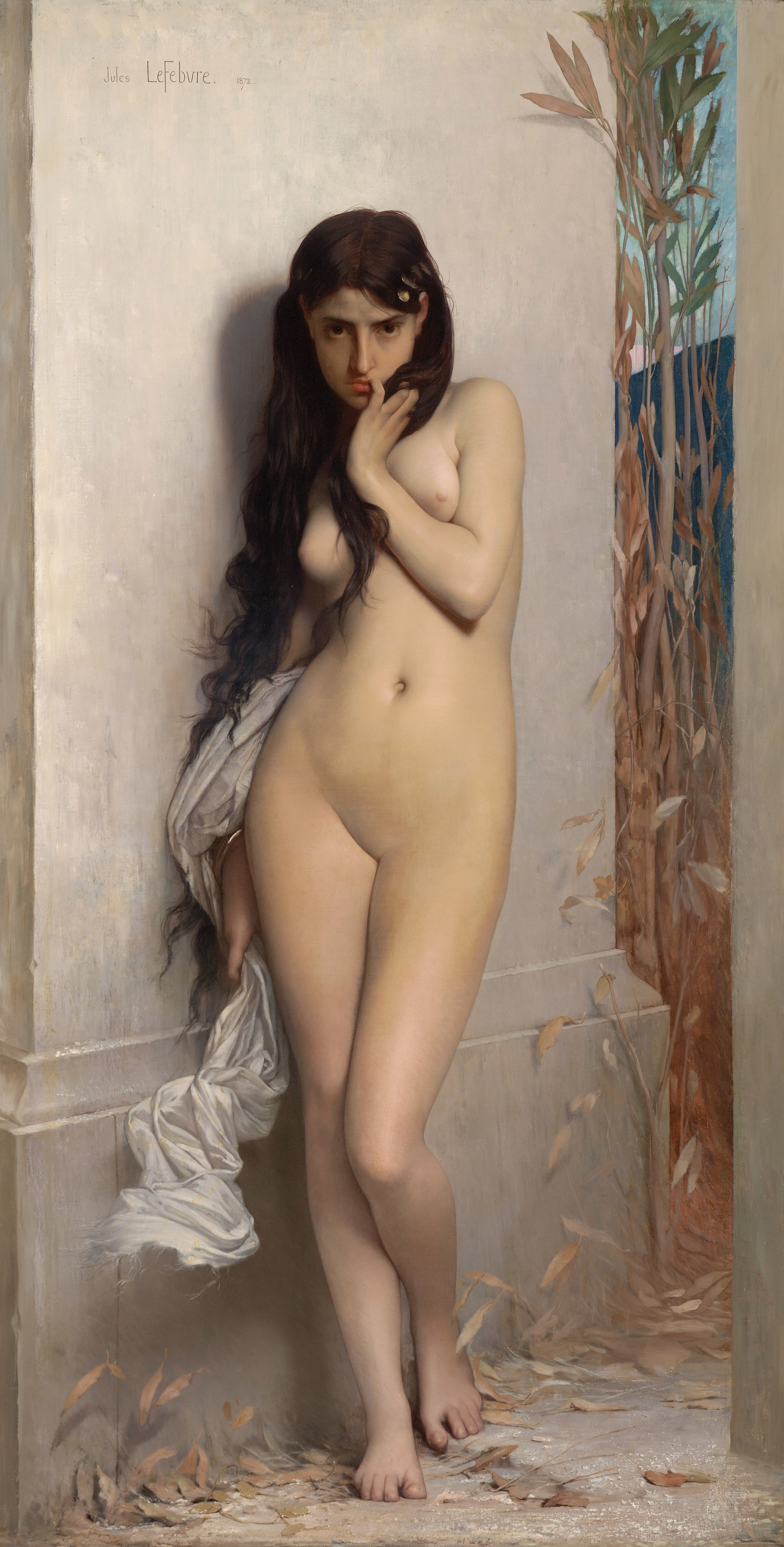
- Artist: Jules Joseph Lefebvre
- Year: 1872
- Type: Oil on canvas
- Dimensions: 186.7 cm × 123.8 cm (73.5 in × 48.7 in)
- Location: National Gallery of Victoria, Melbourne

The Grasshopper (French: La Cigale) is an 1872 oil painting by the French artist Jules Joseph Lefebvre (1836–1911). The painting is in the collection of the National Gallery of Victoria in Melbourne, having been acquired in 2005 through the Felton Bequest.

The nude scene makes allegorical reference to the fable "La Cigale et la Fourmi" by Jean de La Fontaine, a version of The Ant and the Grasshopper, one of Aesop's Fables. After mocking the industrious ant for wasting the summer collecting stores for the winter, the grasshopper suddenly finds itself homeless and destitute when the first winds of winter arrive. Because of the influence of La Fontaine's Fables, in which "La Cigale et la Fourmi" is the first tale, the grasshopper became the proverbial example of improvidence in France so that Lefebvre could paint a picture of a female nude biting one of her nails among the falling leaves and be sure viewers would understand the point by giving it the title La Cigale.

The picture was exhibited at the Salon of 1872 in Paris with a quotation from La Fontaine, Quand la bise fut venue (When the north wind blew).

== Bibliography ==
- Parker, Shalon Detrice (2003). A Tradition Gone Awry: The Salon Nude in Fin-de-siècle France. University of California, Berkeley.
- Van Heugten, Sjraar (2018). Van Gogh and the Seasons. Princeton University Press.
