= Lady Godiva (Lefebvre) =

Painting by Jules Joseph Lefebvre

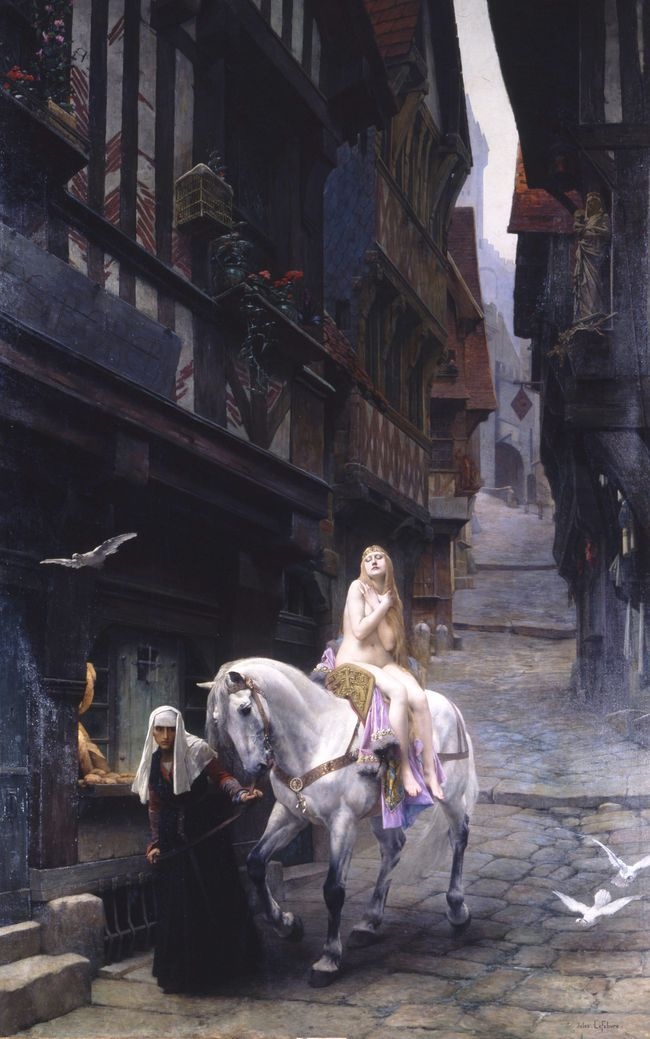
- Artist: Jules Joseph Lefebvre
- Year: 1890
- Type: Oil on canvas, history painting
- Dimensions: 62 cm × 39 cm (24 in × 15 in)
- Location: Musée de Picardie, Amiens

Lady Godiva is an 1890 history painting by the French artist Jules Joseph Lefebvre. It depicts the 11th-century Anglo-Saxon noblewoman Lady Godiva riding naked through the streets of Coventry in the English Midlands. Godiva is portrayed riding side saddle through deserted streets, the inhabitants having gone indoors to respect her modesty. The model for the work was likely Sarah Brown who appeared in other paintings by the artist.

The painting was exhibited at the Salon of 1890 at the Louvre in Paris. Today the painting is in the collection of the Musée de Picardie in Amiens.

== Bibliography ==
- Brauer, Fae (2014). Rivals and Conspirators: The Paris Salons and the Modern Art Centre. Cambridge Scholars Publishing.
- Clarke, Ronald Aquilla; Day, Patrick A. E. (1982). Lady Godiva: Images of a Legend in Art & Society. Leisure Services, Arts and Museums Division.
- Donoghue, David (2008). Lady Godiva: A Literary History of the Legend. Wiley.
- Lathers, Marie (2001). Bodies of Art: French Literary Realism and the Artist's Model. University of Nebraska Press.
