= Jules Joseph Lefebvre =

French painter (1836–1911)

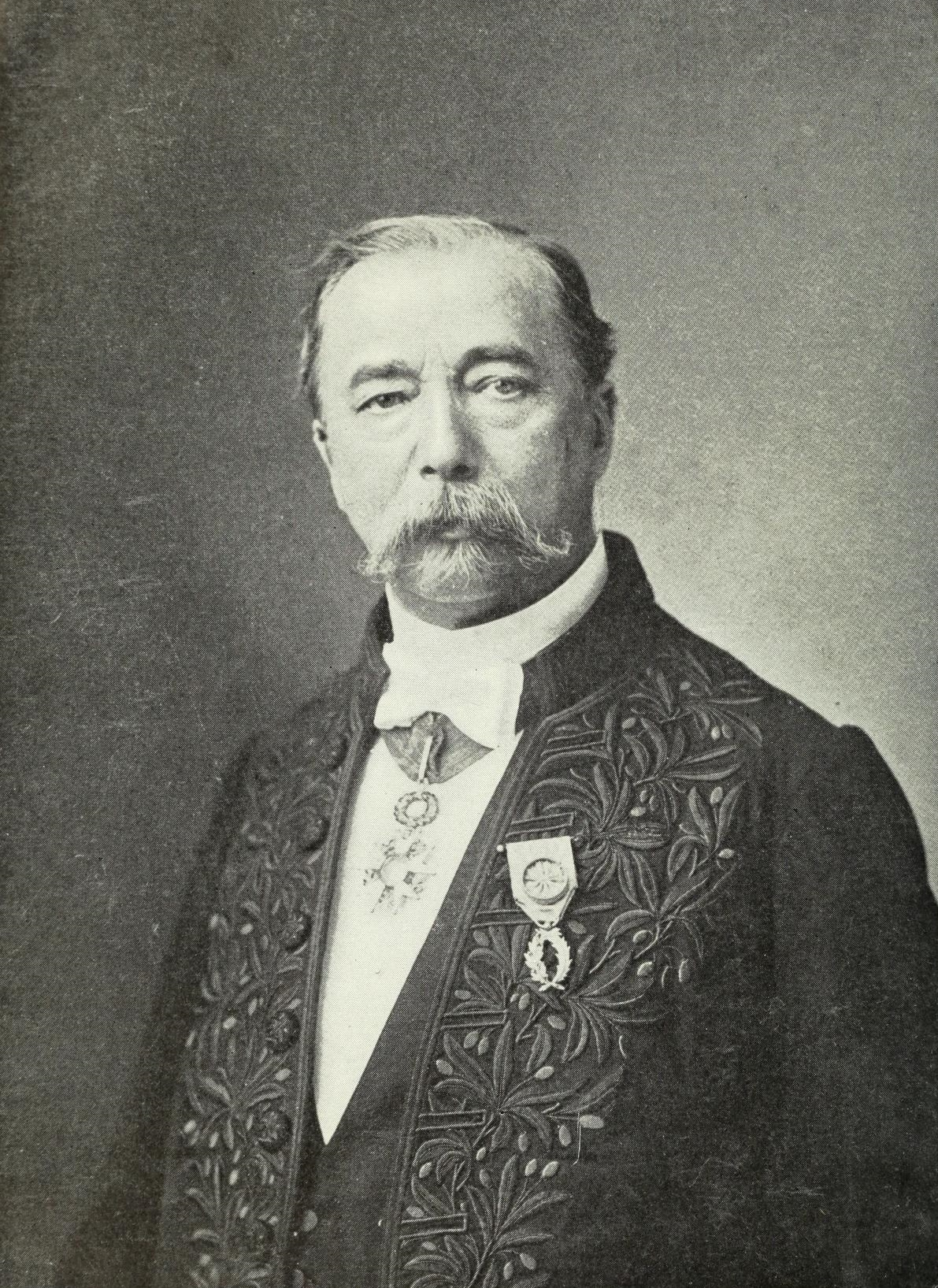
- A photo of Lefebvre (before 1903)
- Born: Jules Joseph Lefebvre; 14 March 1836; Tournan-en-Brie, Seine-et-Marne, France
- Died: 24 February 1911 (aged 74); Paris, France
- Resting place: Montmartre Cemetery
- Other names: Jules Lefebvre
- Alma mater: French Academy in Rome
- Occupation: Painter
- Awards: Officer of the Legion of Honor (1878); Officier de l'Instruction publique; Chevalier of the Legion of Honour (1870)

Signature
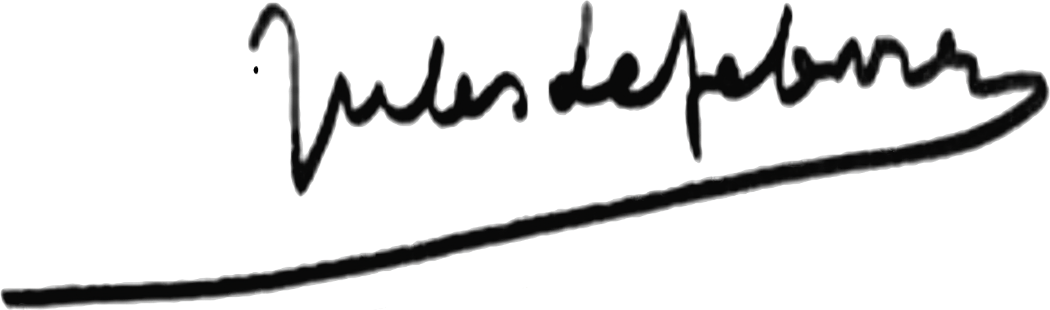

Jules Joseph Lefebvre (French: [ʒyl ʒozɛf ləfɛvʁ]; 14 March 1836 – 24 February 1911) was a French painter, educator and theorist.

== Early life ==
Lefebvre was born in Tournan-en-Brie, Seine-et-Marne, on 14 March 1836. He entered the École nationale supérieure des Beaux-Arts in 1852 and was a pupil of Léon Cogniet.

== Career ==
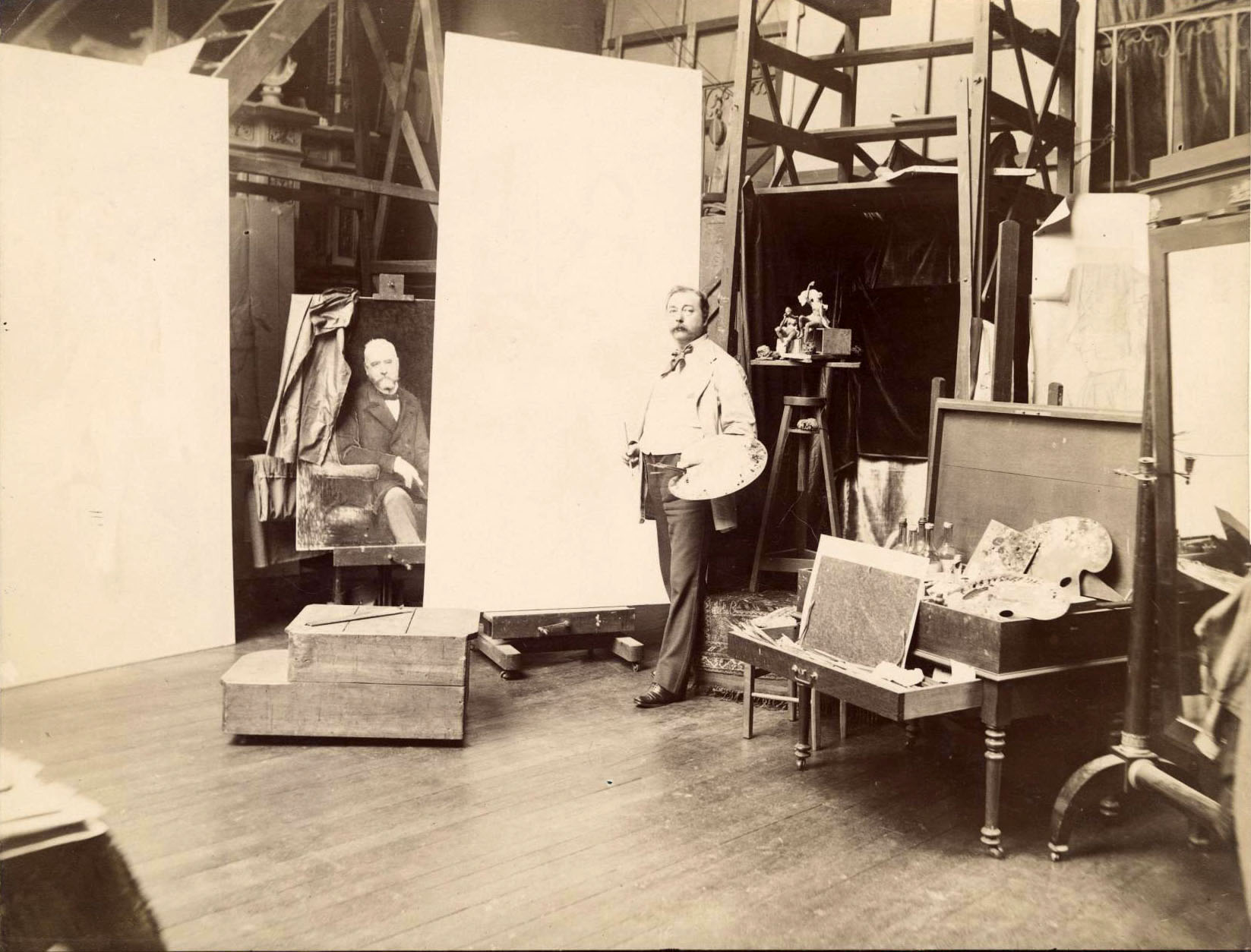
Lefebvre in his studio

He won the prestigious Prix de Rome with his The Death of Priam in 1861. Between 1855 and 1898, he exhibited 72 portraits in the Paris Salon. Many of his paintings are single figures of beautiful women. Among the portraits of his considered the best were those of M. L. Reynaud and the Prince Imperial (1874). In 1891, he became a member of the French Académie des Beaux-Arts.

He was professor at the Académie Julian in Paris. Lefebvre is chiefly important as an excellent and sympathetic teacher who numbered many Americans among his 1500 or more pupils. Among his famous students were Fernand Khnopff, Kenyon Cox, Félix Vallotton, Ernst Friedrich von Liphart, Georges Rochegrosse, the Scottish-born landscape painter William Hart, Walter Lofthouse Dean, and Edmund C. Tarbell, who became an US Impressionist painter. Another pupil was the miniaturist Alice Beckington, as was Laura Leroux-Revault, the daughter of his friend Louis Hector Leroux. Jules Benoit-Lévy entered his workshop at the École nationale supérieure des Beaux-Arts.

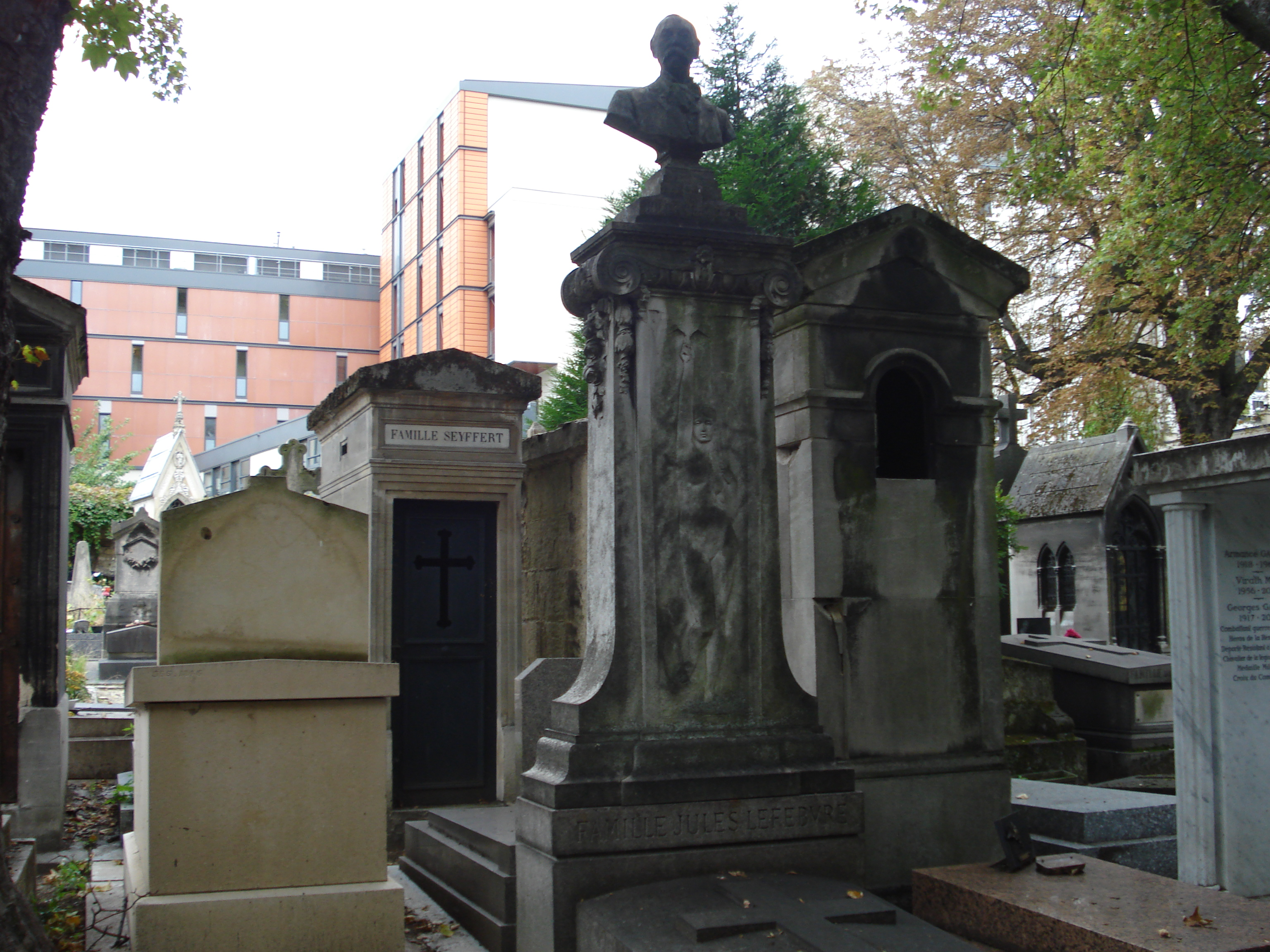
Grave of Lefebvre, Montmartre Cemetery

Lefebvre died in Paris on 24 February 1911 and was buried in the Montmartre Cemetery with a bas-relief depiction of his painting The Truth on his grave.

== Significant milestones ==
- 1853 Student at the École des Beaux-Arts
- 1859 Second place Prix de Rome
- 1861 His The Death of Priam wins the Prix de Rome
- 1870 Académie Julian professor
- 1870 Officer in the Legion of Honour (called 'Commander' from 1898)
- 1891 Member of the Académie des Beaux-Arts

== Selected works ==
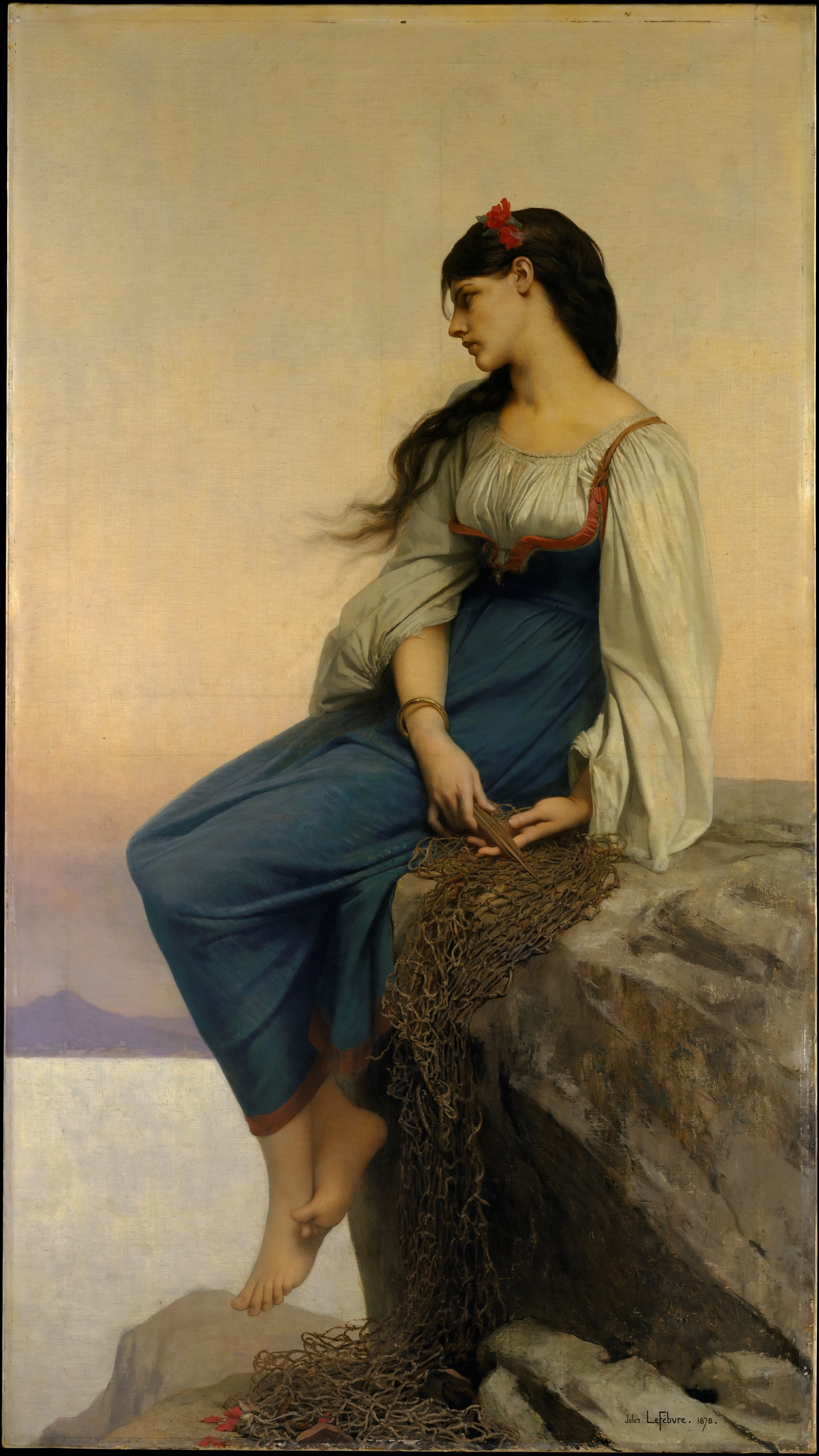
Graziella, 1878 (depicting the protagonist of Alphonse de Lamartine's 1852 novel Graziella)

- 1861 The Death of Priam (won the Prix de Rome), École nationale supérieure des Beaux-Arts
- 1861 Diva Vittoria Colonna
- 1863 Boy Painting a Tragic Mask
- 1864 Roman Charity
- 1865 Portrait of Antonio, Italian model
- 1866 Cornelia, Mother of the Gracchi
- 1868 Reclining Nude, Musée d'Orsay
- 1869 Le Réveil de Diane
- 1869 Portrait of Alexandre Dumas
- 1870 The Truth, Musée d'Orsay
- 1870s Girl with a Mandolin
- 1870 Portrait of Prince Imperial
- 1872 Pandora
- 1872 La Cigale, National Gallery of Victoria (Note: Exhibited Salon, Paris, 1872, no. 970; collection of Milton Latham (1827–82), San Francisco, before 1878; by whom sold, New York, 1879; collection of Daniel Catlin, St Louis, Missouri, 1879–1893; by whom gifted to the St Louis Museum of Fine Arts, 1893–1945; deaccessioned and sold, c. 1945; collection of Julian Sterling, Melbourne, by 1984–2005; from whom purchased for the Felton Bequest, 2005.)
- 1874 Odalisque
- 1874 Slave Carrying Fruit, Museum of Fine Arts Ghent
- 1874 Portrait of Eugène Louis Napoléon Bonaparte
- 1875 Chloé, Young and Jackson Hotel in Melbourne
- 1876 Mary Magdalene in the Cave, Hermitage Museum St. Petersburg
- 1877 Pandora
- 1878 Mignon, Metropolitan Museum of Art
- 1878 Graziella, Metropolitan Museum of Art
- 1879 Diana
- 1879 Diana Surprised, Museo Nacional de Bellas Artes Buenos Aires
- 1880 Portrait of Julia Foster Ward, Museum of Fine Arts Florida
- 1880 Housemaid, Pera Museum
- 1881 La Fiametta from Giovanni Boccaccio
- 1881 Ondine, Museum of Fine Arts Budapest
- 1882 Pandora (II)
- 1882 A Japanese woman
- 1883 Psyché
- 1884 The Feathered Fan
- 1884 Portrait of Edna Barger, private collection
- 1890 Lady Godiva
- 1890 Ophelia
- 1892 A Daughter of Eve
- 1892 Judith
- 1896 Portrait of a Lady (II)
- 1898 Love sharpening its arrows
- 1901 Alexander Agassiz
- 1901 Yvonne, formerly Musée du Luxembourg (Portrait of Lefebvre's daughter)
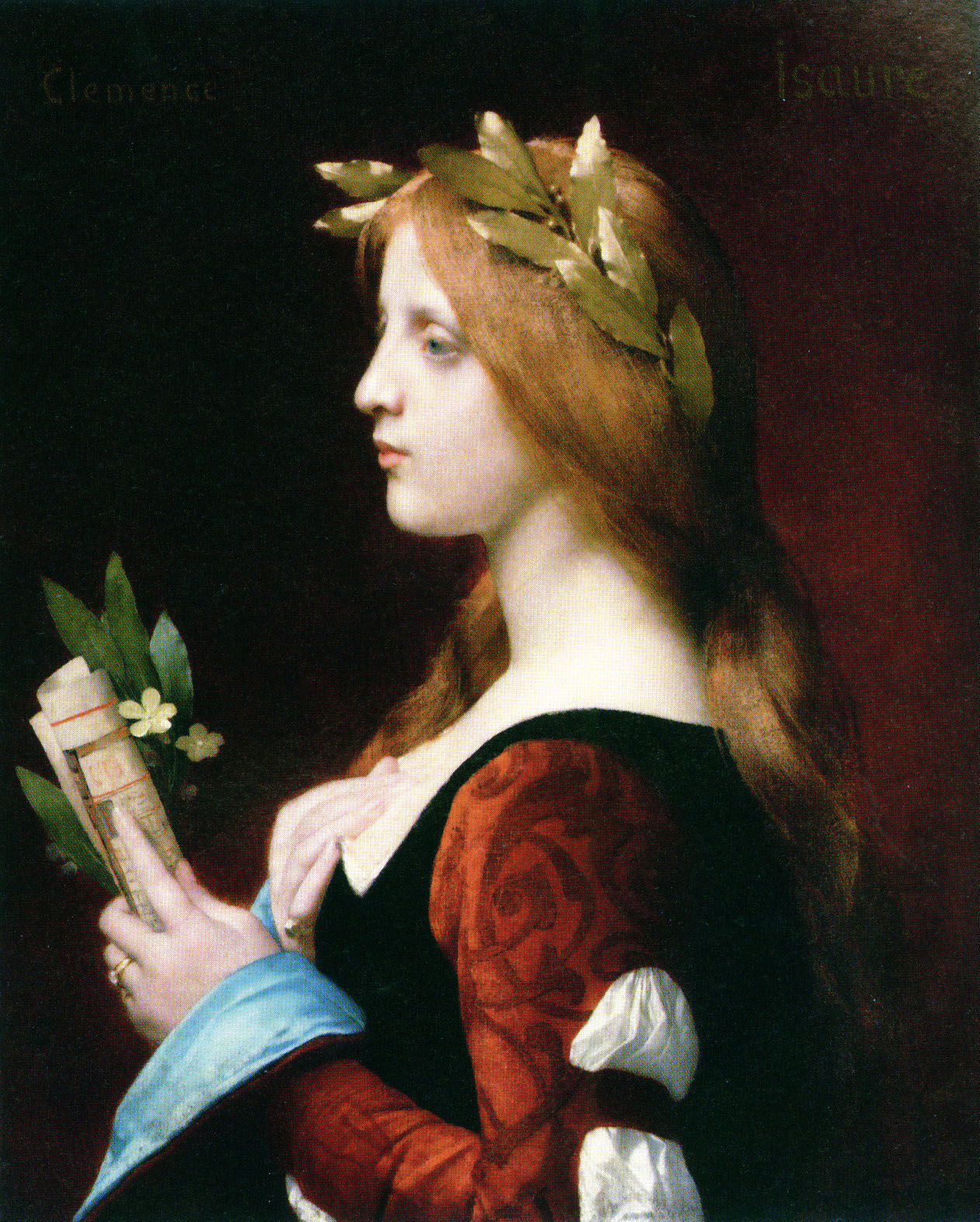
Clémence Isaure

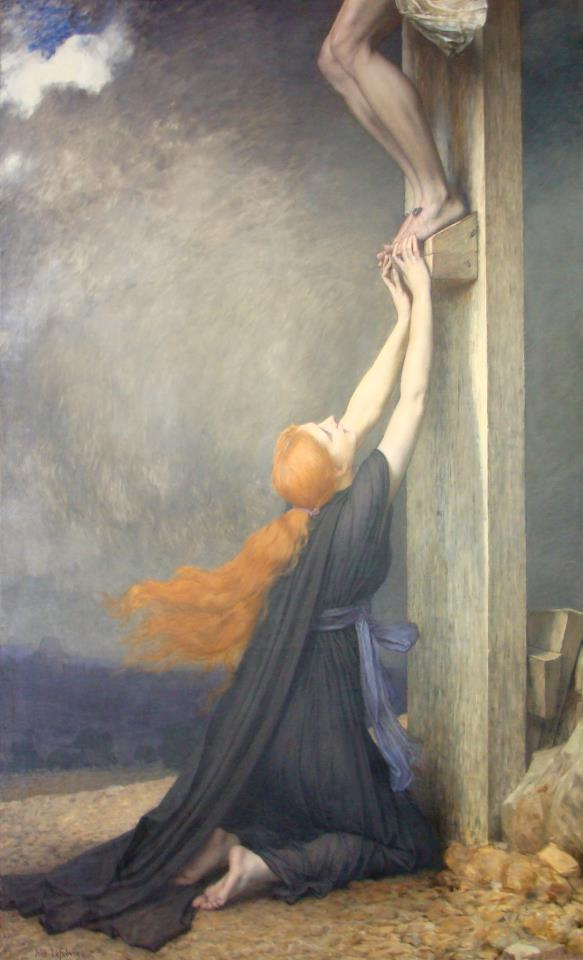
The Sorrow of Mary Magdalene

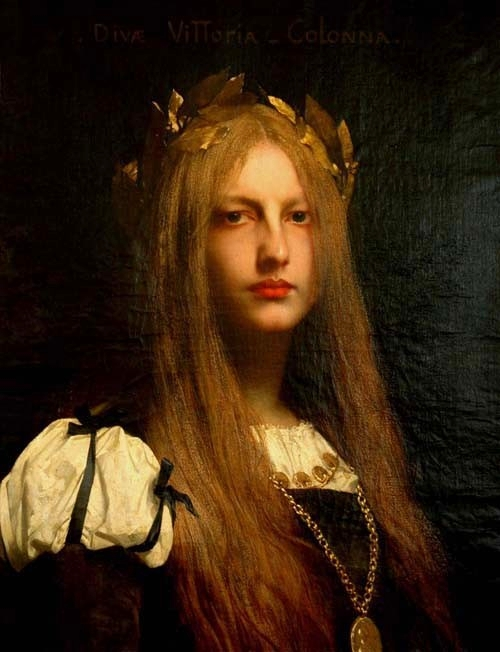
Vittoria Colonna, 1861

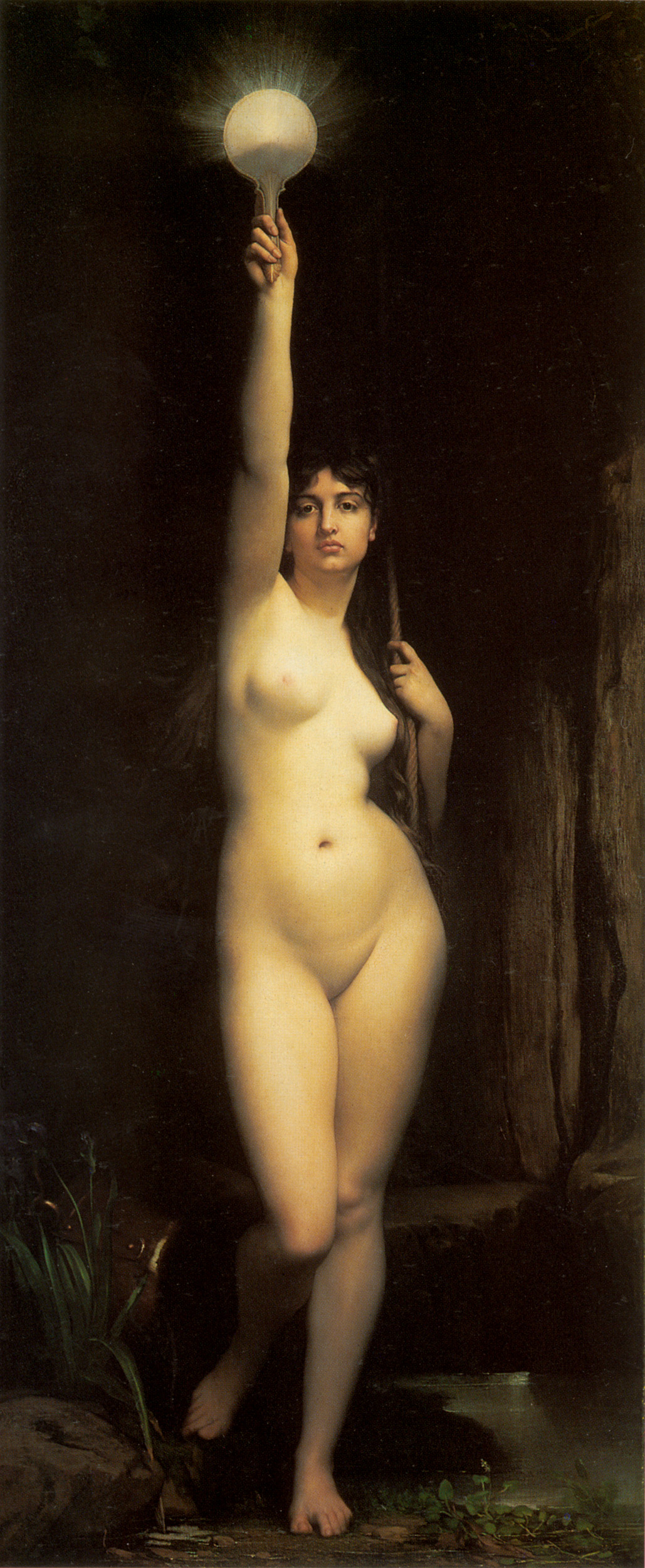
The Truth, 1870

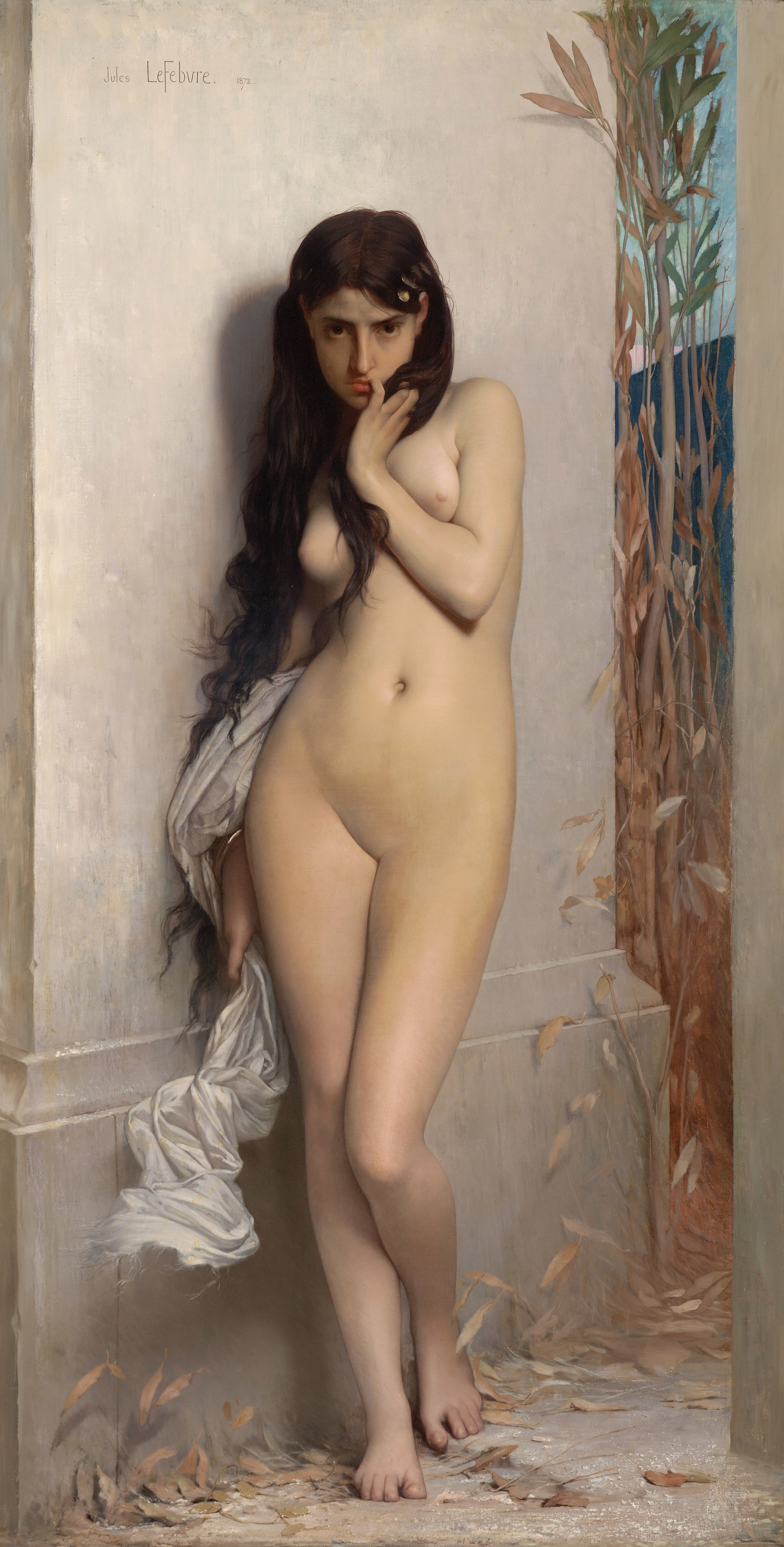
The Grasshopper, 1872

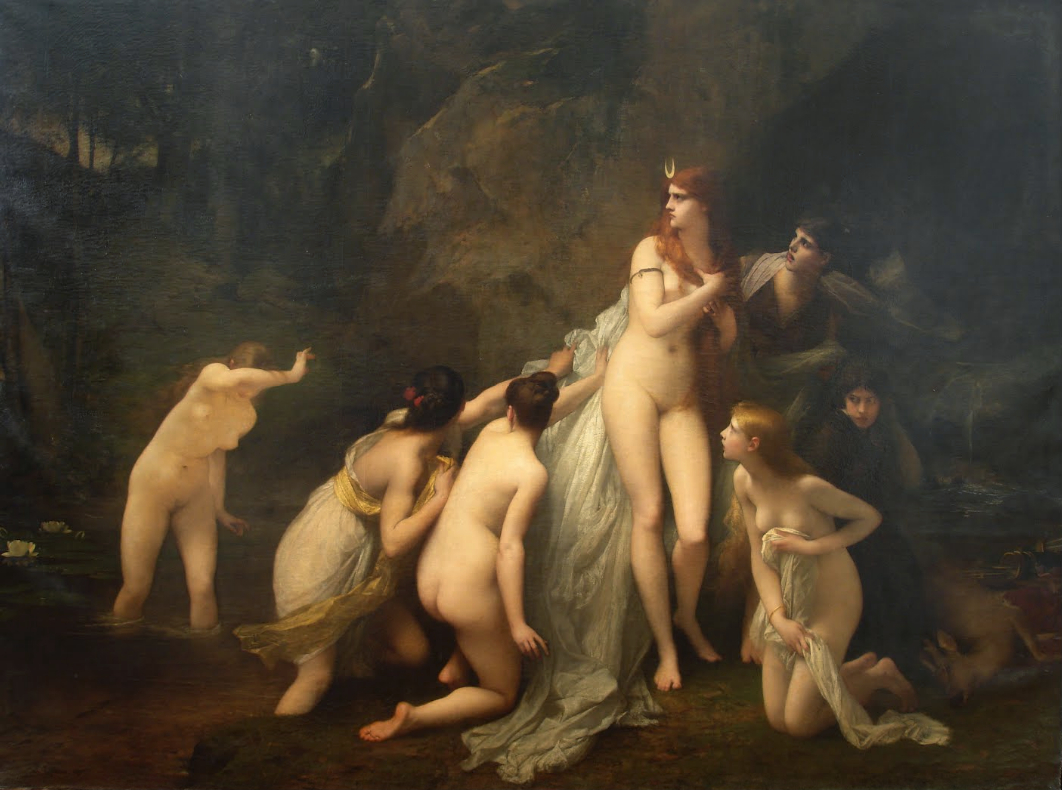
Diana Surprised, 1879

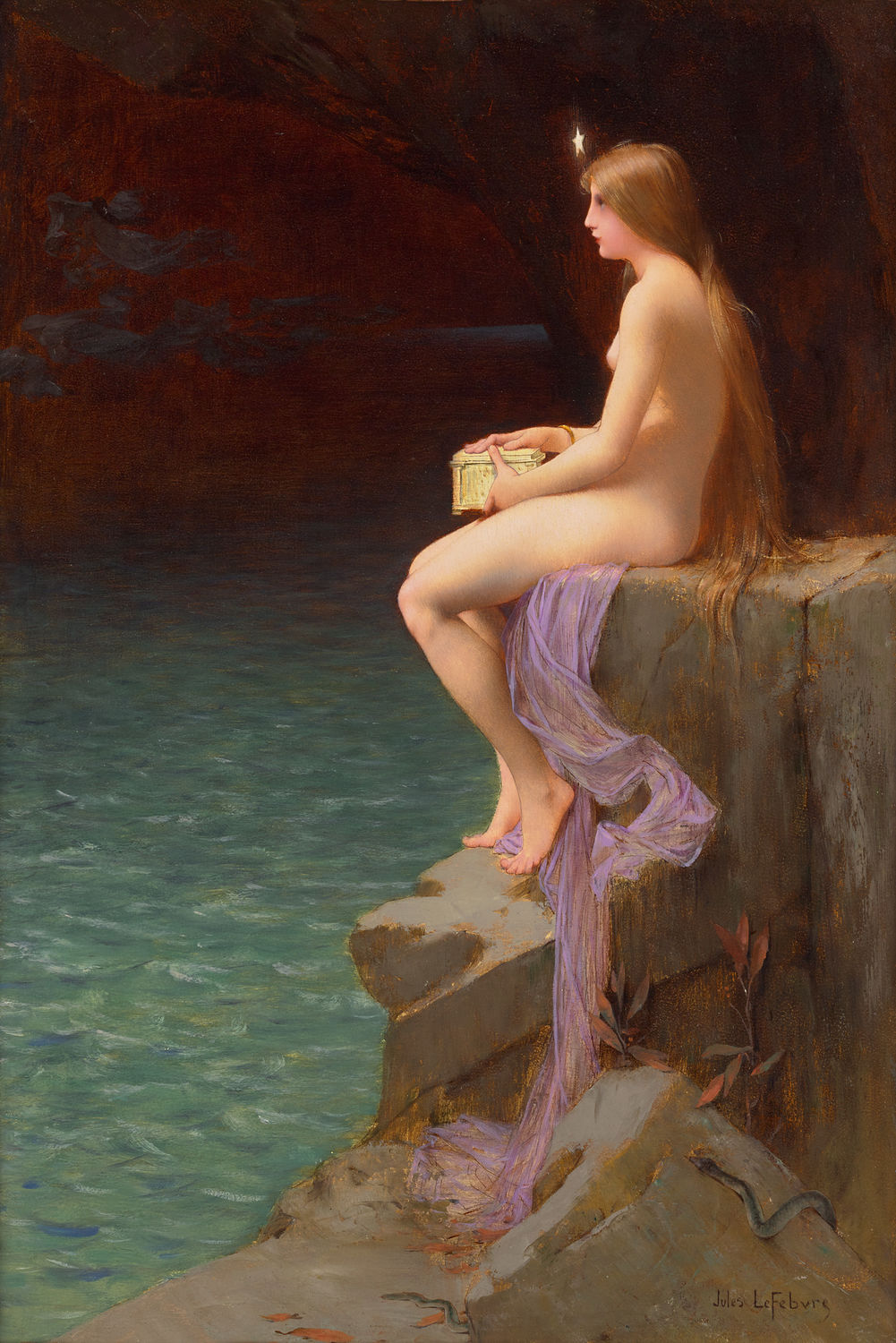
Psyché, 1883

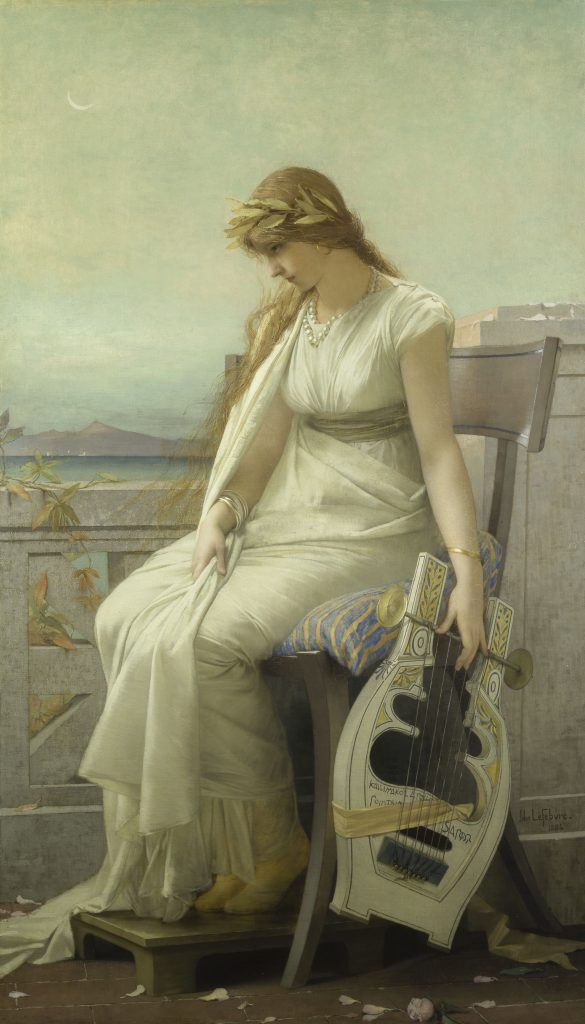
Sappho, 1884

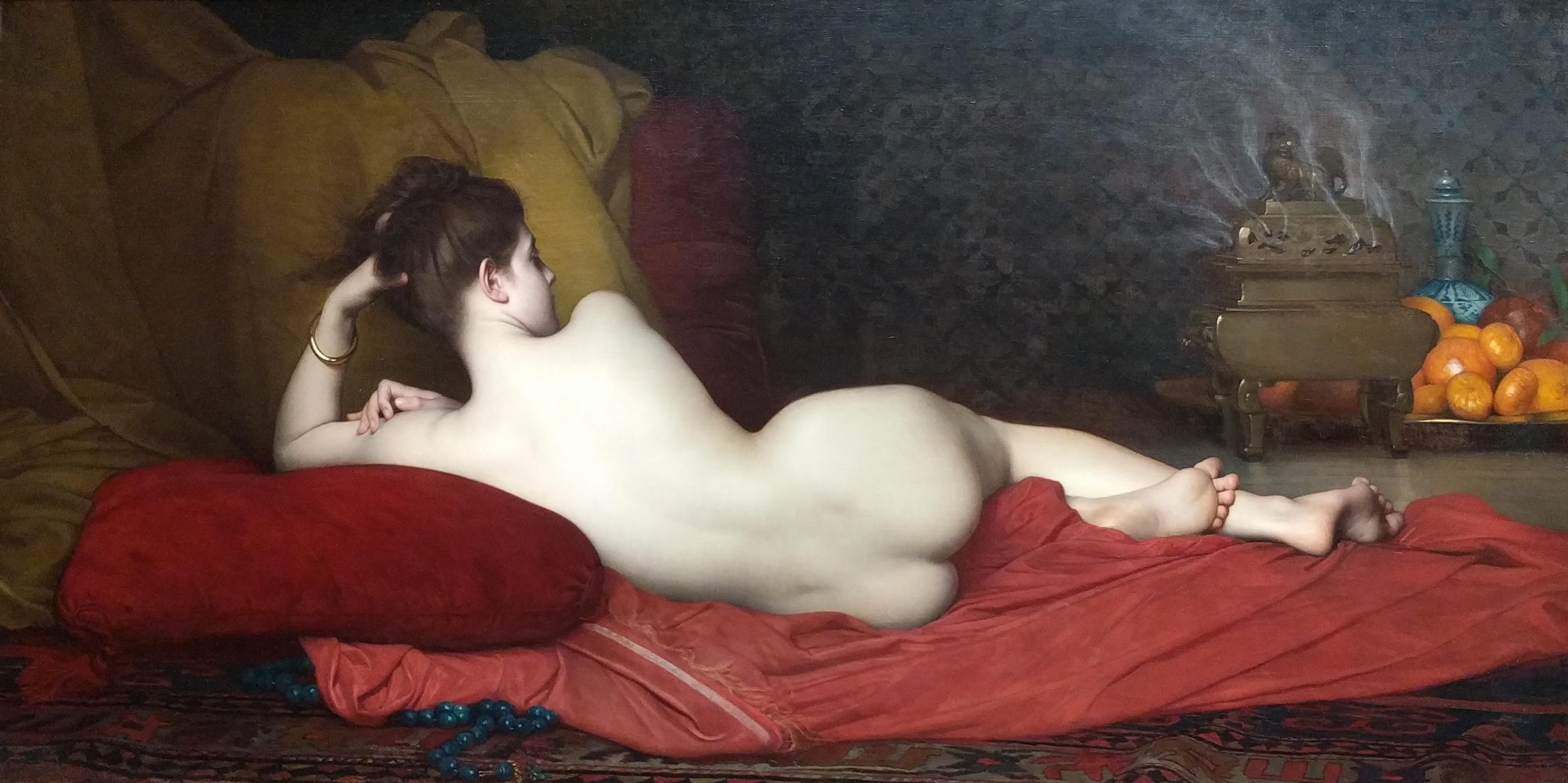
Odalisque, 1874

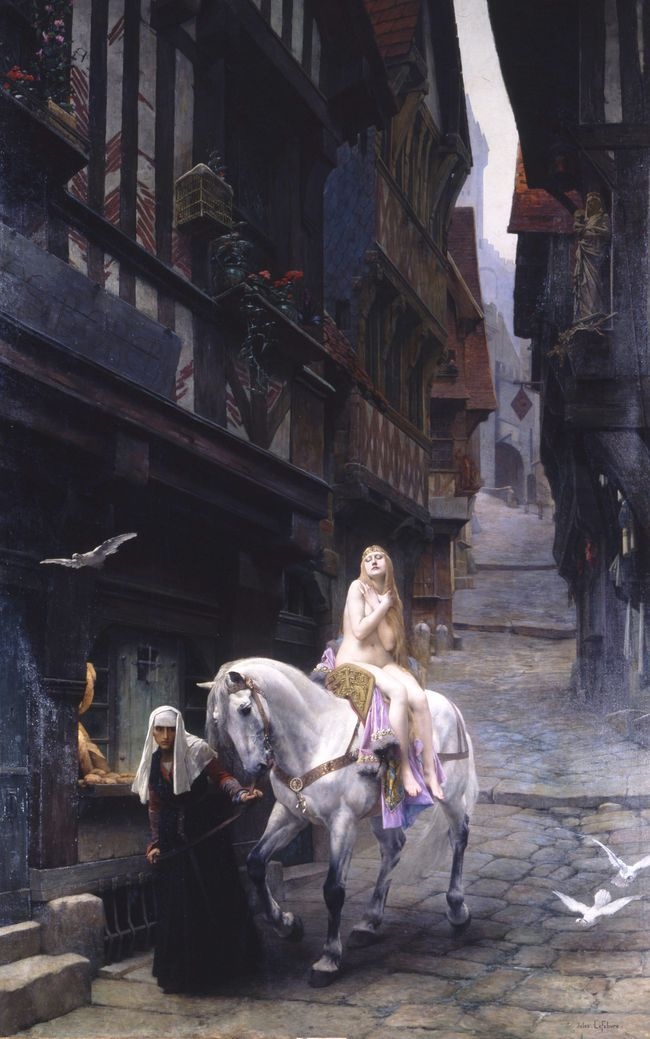
Lady Godiva, 1890

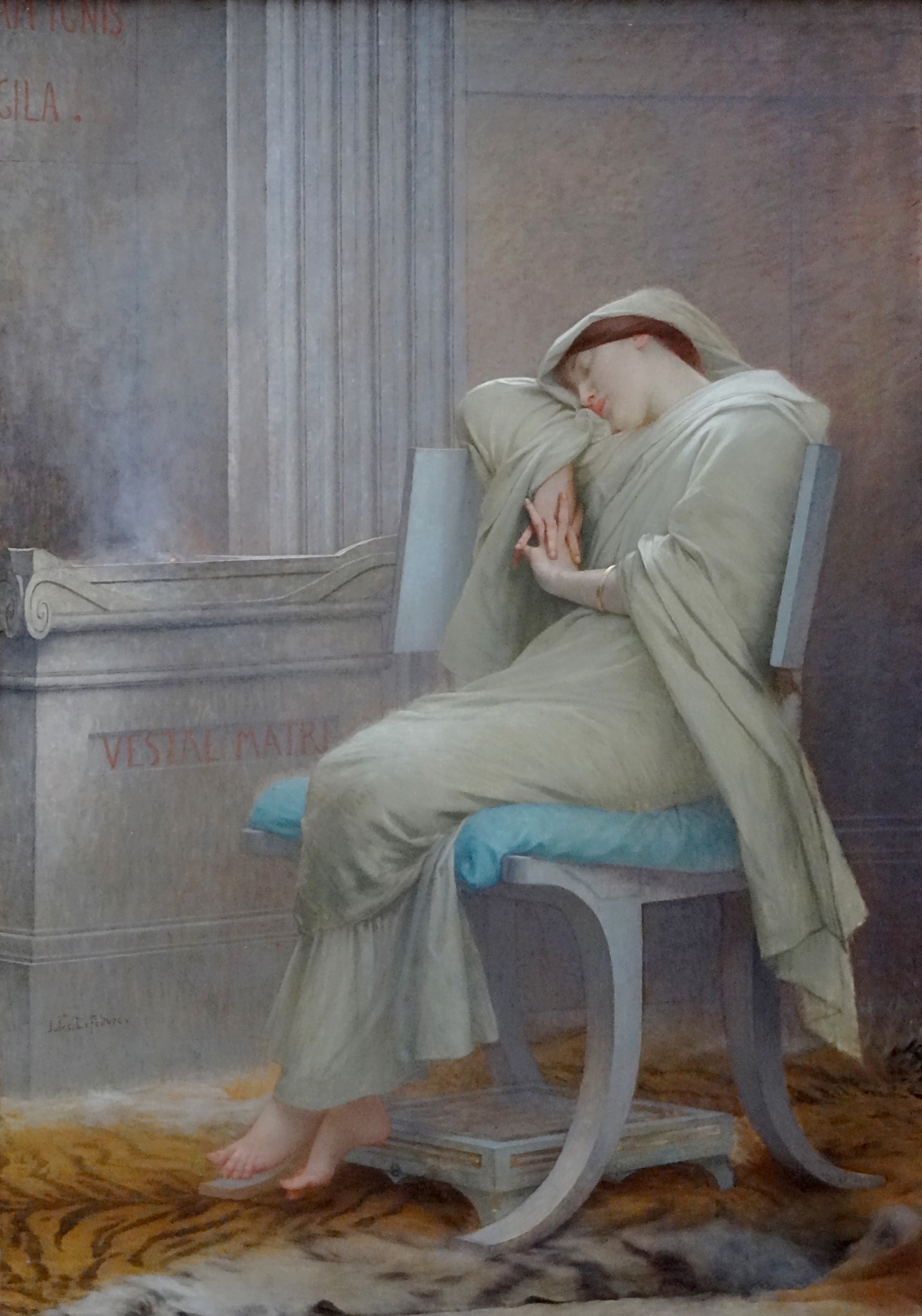
Sleeping vestal virgin, 1902

== Undated works ==
- Clémence Isaure
- Fleurs des Champs
- Wounded Love
- La Fiancée
- Mediterranean Beauty
- Nymph with Morning Glory Flowers
- Portrait of a Lady
- Portrait of a Woman
- The Sorrow of Mary Magdalene
- Woman with an Orange
- Young Woman with Morning Glories in Her Hair

== See also ==
- Samantha Littlefield Huntley, one of his students
- Angèle Delasalle, a student at Académie Julian
