= The Death of Priam (Lefebvre) =

1861 painting by Jules Lefebvre

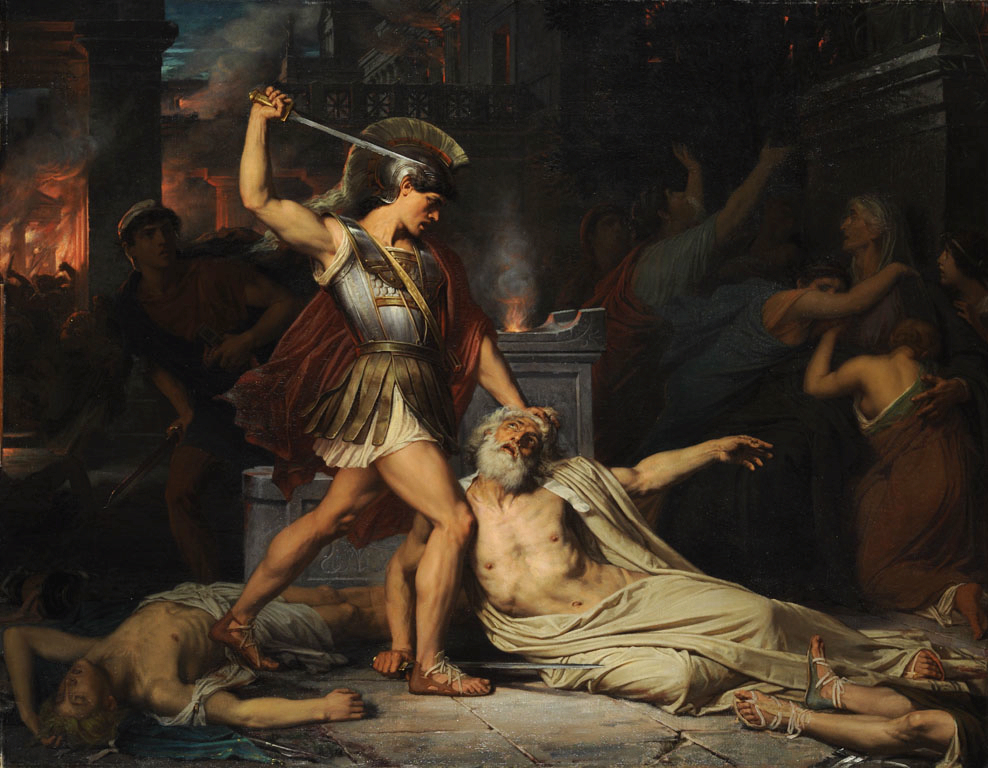
The Death of Priam (1861) by Jules Lefebvre

The Death of Priam is an 1861 oil on canvas by Jules Lefebvre. He entered it for the Prix de Rome, which it won. It depicts the death of King Priam during the Sack of Troy, as described in Virgil's Aeneid (Book II, lines 506–558). Priam, the king of Troy, is killed by Achilles' son Neoptolemus. In Virgil's description, Neoptolemus first kills Priam's son Polites in front of his father as he seeks sanctuary on the altar of Zeus; Neoptolemus then drags Priam to the altar and kills him there.

The painting is now in the collection of the Beaux-Arts de Paris, in Paris, with the catalogue number PRP 111.

== Exhibition history ==
- USA, 1984-1985 : The Grand Prix de Rome, 1797-1863, National Academy of Design, New York, January–March 1984, The Virginia Museum of Fine Arts, Richmond, April–May 1984, Indianapolis Museum of Art, Indianapolis, July–August 1984, The Walter Art Gallery, Baltimore, September–October 1984, Phoenix Art Museum, Phoenix, November 1984-January 1985, The Society of the Four Arts, Palm Beach, February–March 1985, San Antonio Museum of Art, San Antonio, April–June 1985, New Orleans Museum of Art, New Orléans, July–September 1985.
- Japan, 1989, The Prix de Rome for painting, Tokyo, Shoto Museum of Art
- France, USA, 2004–2006, Gods and Mortals : Homeric Themes in the collections of the École nationale supérieure des beaux-arts de Paris : École nationale supérieure des beaux-arts, Paris, 21 September-28 November 2004, Princeton university art museum, Princeton, USA, 8 October 2005 – 15 January 2006, Dahesh museum, New York, USA, October 2005-January 2006.
- France, 2012, La Dernière nuit de Troie, violence et classicisme dans l'art européen du XIX siecle, musée des beaux-arts d'Angers, 25 May-12 September 2012
- China, 2014–2015, Chinese Museum of Art, Peking, 30 October 2014 - April 2015

== Bibliography ==
- (in French) Philippe Grunchec, Le Grand Prix de peinture, les concours des prix de Rome de 1797 à 1863, preface by Jacques Thuillier. Paris, 1983, p. 316
- (in French) Catalogue, La Dernière nuit de Troie, violence et classicisme dans l'art européen du XIX siecle, Angers, musée des beaux-arts, exposition 25 mai-12 septembre 2012, pp. 100–101
